= Barbara Maples =

American photographer

- Born: 1912; Temple
- Died: 1999 (aged 86–87); Dallas
- Occupation: Photographer

Barbara Lucile Maples (1912–1999) was an American photographer, artist, educator and professor. She is known for her work with modernist photographic techniques in the style known as Texas Bauhaus. Her work is part of the permanent collection of several museums.

== Biography ==
Maples was born in Temple, Texas in 1912. She graduated from the University of Mary-Hardin Baylor with a bachelor of arts in 1933 and then went on to get her Master of Fine Arts from Columbia University in 1939. Maples attended Temple High School and graduated from there in 1929.

She taught art in the Dallas independent school District between 1937 and 1964 and also taught at the Dallas Museum of Art between 1940 and 1954. Maples was a professor and the head of the Department of Art Education at Southern Methodist University from 1965 to 1978. Maples was the president of the Texas Printmakers from 1945 to 1946 and also served as the organization treasurer from 1950 to 1960.

In 1999, she died in Dallas and was buried in the family plot in Temple.

== Career ==
Maples was proficient in painting, ceramics, sculpture, printmaking and weaving. Maples studied printmaking during the summers between 1943 and 1945 with Lawrence Barrett. Maples was influenced in her photography work by Carlotta Corpron, who she worked with at the Texas Women's University (TWU) on weekends. Maples' photography was experimental in nature. She used everyday objects in her photo work, transforming the ordinary into abstract art. Some of her photographs did not use camera work, but instead was created directly in the light room.

Maples was included in the 1938 exhibition at the Dallas Museum of Art, "Exhibition by Women Artists of Dallas County." In 1944, Maples won an honorable mention for her painting, Satin Glass and Fruit in the Sixth Texas General Exhibition held at the Dallas Museum of Art. In 1959, Maples' print, Summer Madness (1956) was shown in the exhibition, "60 Prints by 60 Artists from Local Collections: Post-War Prints 1946–1959." Maples participated in an exhibition at the Dallas Museum of Art in 1990 called "Photographic Abstractions: Barbara Maples & Carlotta Corpron."

Maples' work is part of the permanent collections of the Dallas Museum of Art, the El Paso Museum of Art and the Amon Carter Museum of American Art. Maples' work was also purchased by the Corpus Christi Art Foundation.

Her work was included in the 2021 exhibition Women in Abstraction at the Centre Pompidou.
