= Margaret Garcia =

Mexican-American visual artist

- Born: September 20, 1951 (age 74); Los Angeles, California
- Education: California State University Northridge; Los Angeles City College; University of Southern California
- Known for: Muralist, Painter
- Notable work: "Tree of Califas"
- Style: Contemporary Chicano art
- Movement: Chicano Movement
- Spouse: Rhett Beavers
- Awards: William Comfort Tiffany Foundation Award Feitelson/Lundberg Award California Community Foundation Grant
- Patrons: 1984 Olympics
- Website: www.MargaretGarciaStudio.com

Margaret Garcia (born September 20, 1951) is an American Chicana muralist, educator, and arts advocate based in Los Angeles. Her work incorporates Mexican, Indigenous, and Chicana/o cultural themes. Garcia has been associated with the Chicana art movement and has worked as an educator and mentor to emerging artists. Her paintings, which incorporate bold colors and cultural symbolism, are held in collections including the Los Angeles County Museum of Art and the Cheech Marin Center for Chicano Art & Culture. Garcia has worked in arts education, including teaching at institutions such as Plaza de la Raza, and has contributed to public art projects in California.

== Early life and education ==
Margaret Garcia was born on September 20, 1951, at County General Hospital in Boyle Heights, California. She is of Tarahumara Indigenous descent. Growing up in East L.A., she was immersed in a diverse and dynamic cultural landscape that would later influence her artistic themes. This environment exposed Garcia to the struggles and resilience of the Latino and Indigenous communities of Los Angeles, which became recurring themes in her work. She found inspiration in the people around her, using her early works to depict the daily lives and struggles of Chicanos in Los Angeles. Her family played an important role in shaping her worldview; her grandmother, who was a midwife and trauma nurse, instilled in her a deep appreciation for community care and resilience.

From a young age, Garcia displayed an affinity for art through her portrait drawings of family and neighbors at age ten, but she did not start painting until the age of twenty-one. Also at twenty-one, Garcia took custody of her younger brother, who was only eleven years old at the time.

Garcia pursued formal education in the arts at Los Angeles City College (LACC) before continuing her studies at California State University, Northridge (CSUN), where she deepened her understanding of Chicanismo and political expression. However, she left CSUN after only a short time, feeling that she was not receiving the artistic mentorship she needed. Determined to refine her artistic vision, she later resumed her education and earned a Master of Fine Arts (MFA) from the University of Southern California (USC) in 1992. She had been accepted into the studio arts program without having received a bachelor's degree. Her time at USC provided her with critical exposure to contemporary art movements while reinforcing her dedication to Chicana/o identity and storytelling through art. Throughout her education, Garcia remained deeply connected to Los Angeles' Chicano Art Movement, particularly the growing muralist movement that sought to bring Latino stories into public spaces; notably her contributions to the murals of the 1984 Olympics.

== Career and artworks ==
Throughout her career, Garcia has been a defining presence in the Chicano Art Movement, using her work to capture the cultural vibrancy and resilience of Latino communities in Southern California. She is best known for her expressive oil paintings, which incorporate bold color palettes, layered textures, and themes of identity, family, and heritage. Her paintings frequently depict Latino cultural traditions, family life, and the evolving landscapes of Los Angeles, serving as both personal and collective reflections of Chicano identity.

Garcia began her professional career as an artist in the 1970s, a time when the Chicano Art Movement was flourishing in Los Angeles. She became involved in the Citywide Mural Project, which encouraged public art as a means of community empowerment. This experience solidified her belief that art should be accessible, representative, and deeply tied to social injustice. Her work often incorporates elements of Mexican folk art, Catholic iconography, and Indigenous symbolism, blending these influences with an expressive use of color.

Garcia is a prolific painter (primarily of portraits) and has painted several murals in the greater Los Angeles area. She is committed to documenting her community through artwork, ensuring that its members—beyond stereotypes—are recognized and remembered. Oner of her public art projects, the "Tree of Califas" at the Universal City/Studio City Metro station, explores the history of California's Indigenous and Mexican heritage, showcasing Garcia's ability to translate historical narratives into visually compelling public art. Unlike traditional gallery-based work, her murals serve as a form of public storytelling, emphasizing cultural identity, resistance, and the lived experiences of marginalized communities.

Her work has been widely exhibited, including at the Los Angeles County Museum of Art and the Cheech Marin Center for Chicano Art and Culture, highlighting her influence in both local and national art spaces.

Garcia has also worked as an educator, teaching painting courses and workshops and giving lectures in the region. In 2000, she was commissioned by the Los Angeles County Metro Art program to create a mural at the University City subway station. Garcia teaches oil painting at Plaza de la Raza's School of Performing and Visual Arts and curates art exhibitions. Her work in arts education includes mentoring emerging Chicana/o artists and supporting the use of art for cultural expression and activism. As a mentor and educator, she encourages artists to develop work based on personal experiences and their engagement with their subjects.

In 2010, Garcia founded the "Stamp Project" which interests local Chiana/o and women artists an opportunity of pursuing recognition through her "Creating Cultural Currency" movement.

In 2022, she was the subject of a major retrospective titled "Arte Para la Gente: The Collected Works of Margaret Garcia" at LA Plaza de Cultura y Artes, which showcased over 75 of her works and celebrated her contributions to Chicano and public art.

=== "Night on Figueroa Street" ===
2002, oil on wood panel, 48.25" x 60" inches

Garcia's art often portrays local neighborhoods and landmarks, celebrating the subjects that inspire her and contribute to how her community is represented. This artwork captures the vibrant essence of Los Angeles's Figueroa Street at night, reflecting Garcia's deep connection to her community and urban life.

=== "Magic in the Children's Garden" ===
This piece is an example of what much of Garcia's artwork looks like; vibrant with bold colors and an expressive style, characterized by a rich palette and dynamic brushwork. This piece draws inspiration from Mexican folk art traditions, reflecting from her cultural heritage and personal experiences.

=== "Finding Jesus at the Taco Stand" ===
2009, 10 x 13 in., oil on canvas, University of Wyoming Art Museum, Laramie, Wyoming

Part of the Cheech Marin Collection, this painting is a reflection of the predominantly Chicano neighborhood that Garcia grew up with in Boyle Heights. It is also featured in the artbook collection of small paintings entitled "Chicanitas from the Cheech Marin Collection."

=== "Two Blue Whales" ===
1992, 17' X 63' ft, Acrylic, Venice Blvd., Los Angeles, CA

Inspired by a news story about Blue Whales being hunted to extinction, Garcia created a mural featuring two Blue Whales playing in the ocean. The sixty-foot mural is painted on a wall between Beethoven St. and Venice Blvd. in Mar Vista.

=== "Tree of Califas" ===
2000, Mural, Universal City Station, L.A. Metro Rail, Los Angeles, CA

The mural presents tourists and residents with information about an historic event that took place on the land adjacent to the metro station. At this historic site, California was ceded to the United States from Mexico. The state was named after the fictional queen Calafia, and the artwork is designed to evoke the mature pepper trees that used to grow along nearby Lankershim Boulevard.

=== "Glorious Day Echo Park" ===
2020, Oil on Wood Panel, W: 38 x H: 30 in., Echo Park Lake, Los Angeles, CA

The painting presents an angle that avoids the loudness of downtown LA, observing Echo Park Lake. The landscape is provided in bold, rich, colorful strokes. Between 2019 and 2021, Echo Park Lake had a high number of homeless population, and by 2021 tents were removed from the surrounding area.

== Exhibitions ==
=== Solo exhibitions ===
- "Viision of Phantasmagoria", May 2009, Freemont Art Gallery, Pasadena, CA
- "Home Again: Margaret Garcia's Return", Aug.-Sept. 2016, Medical Village Gallery, USC County Medical Center, Los Angeles, CA
- "Arte Para La Gente", Oct. 2020-Jan. 2021, Museum of Ventura County, Ventura County, CA

=== Group exhibitions ===
- "Chicano Visions: American Painters on the Verge", June-Sept. 2005, Mexican Fine Arts Center Museum Main Gallery and Torres Gallery, National Museum of Mexican Art, Chicago, IL
- "Adelante! Mexican American Artists: 1960's and Beyond", Sept. 2011-Jan. 2012 Forest Lawn Museum, Glendale, CA
- "Today Is The Shadow Of Tomorrow: Día De Los Muertos 2015 Exhibition", Oct.-Nov. 2015, SOMArts Cultural Center, San Francisco, CA
- "Prayer Pieces", Dec. 2015, Casa 0101, Los Angeles, CA
- "Born In The Heart", May 2016, ChimMaya Art Gallery, Los Angeles, CA
- "Defining Ourselves: A Matriarchy of Artists" Oct. 2016, The Muckenthaler Cultural Center, Fullerton, CA
- "Papel Chicano Dos: Works on Paper from the Collection of Cheech Marin", Feb.-May 2017, Riverside Art Museum, Riverside, CA
- "LA/LA/LA", Sept.-Oct. 2017, Robert Berman Gallery, Santa Monica, CA
- "Summer in the City", Jul.-Aug. 2017, Avenue 50 Studio, Los Angeles, CA
- Atzlan: A Sense of Place", Oct. 2017-Jan. 2018, The dA Center for the Arts, Pomona, CA
- "Lowrider: A Group Show", Apr.-May 2018, Avenue 50 Studio, Los Angeles, CA
- "Black, Brown and Beige", Aug.-Sep. 2019, The Self Help Graphics & Art, Los Angeles, CA
- "Ascending In Power And Significance: Women On The Rise", March 2020, Vita Art Center, Ventura, CA

== Collections ==
Margaret Garcia's artworks can be found in the permanent collections of several major museums including, the Cheech Marin Center for Chicano Art, Los Angeles County Museum of Art, The Museum of Ventura County, La Salle University Art Museum, Laguna Art Museum, Blanton Museum of Art, The Roswell Museum and Art Center, Fine Arts Museums of San Francisco, Forest Lawn Museum of Glendale, the Riverside Art Museum, the Musée d'Aquitaine and the University of Wyoming Art Museum.

== Honors and awards ==
- California Arts Council, Artist in Residence
- Brody Fellowship in Visual Arts
- Feitelson-Lundeberg Award, Los Angeles Municipal Art Gallery (1989)
- Louis Comfort Tiffany Visual Arts (1993)
- Design Award, Southern California Society of Architects (1994)
- Getty Award in Visual Art (2005)
- Cola Award, City of Los Angeles (2006)
- NEA Our Town, Watts, Artistic Project Manager
- Eastside Initiative (Los Angeles) - Toy Project (2019)
- Honored at the 13th Annual Aztlan exhibition "Aztlan Mujeres de Aztlan/Desde el corazon de la mujer (From The Hearts of Women)" at the dA Center for the Arts in Pomona from Oct 9-Nov 21, 2015.
