= John M. Valadez =

Chicano artist

John M. Valadez (born in 1951, Los Angeles, California) is a Chicano artist living in Los Angeles known for photorealistic, dreamlike paintings and pastels. He is also a muralist and a photographer. Valadez has exhibited widely, and his work is in many national and international collections.

Valadez says painting is "like being a writer." His goal is "to make little cinematic moments. Like stills of a movie. Because we’re all trying to find transcendence... That’s what really interests me."

Valadez’s 35-year retrospective, Santa Anna Condition, opened at the Museum of Contemporary Art San Diego, and traveled to the National Museum of Mexican Art in Chicago and the Vincent Price Museum in LA in 2012-13.

== Early life ==
Valadez was born in 1951 at Los Angeles General Hospital, when his mother was 17 and his father was 19. He grew up in the Boyle Heights neighborhood of Los Angeles. After his younger brother was born, his parents separated.

Valadez liked to draw as a child. He was disappointed when friends didn't believe he had made a rendering of Fred Flintstone that he showed to them. He recalls that Salvador Dalí was popular in high school, be he preferred "the Ashcan School; painting what the streets were like. I was always inspired by documentary photography, people like Diane Arbus and Lisette Model."

== Education ==
Valadez attended the East Los Angeles Junior College for two years, where he was active in a theater group. He performed at the Mexican American Center for Creative Arts (MACCA), and he also studied art history and art practice.

Valadez recalls: "I was very fortunate to have Roberto Chavez. Chavez was the first Chicano art teacher... I didn’t have any aspirations other than to draw better and learn how to paint. A lot of my friends were much better at drawing... The ones who struggle, we’re the ones that keep at it. If it comes too easy you want to do something else." Valadez also remembers going to LACMA, where he saw "Warhol, Agnes Martin, Kienholz. I was like 17, 18. I went to the Film-X Film Festival. I saw the premiere of Eraserhead. Gronk was there."

Valadez transferred to the California State University, Long Beach, where he received his Bachelor of Fine Arts in 1976. He painted many murals after graduation.

Valadez cofounded the Public Arts Center in Highland Park in the 1970s. None of the murals he painted in the 1970s survive. Valadez came to realize that murals were "temporary."

== Artistic career ==
Valadez was one of the early Chicano movement artists. He was a member of the well-known groups Los Four and Centro de Arte Publico. The Latinx Forum calls him "A trailblazer of the early Chicano Arts Movement in the 70’s and 80’s." One critic says he is "perhaps the quintessential Chicano photorealist artist." His photography served as a basis for his highly detailed paintings and pastels. Valadez depicted ordinary, working-class people in Los Angeles. The Latinx Forum says "the transmutations in his work evoke the ebbs and flows of fluidity between multiple cultures, idioms, and visual lexicons, effectively mirroring the unrestful experience of the Chicano identity." It adds that Valadez "was one of the first painters to portray social commentaries and witnessed encounters with dignity, pride, and the distinctive aesthetics of his communities in Downtown, Boyle Heights and East LA."

Valadez explains his goals and motives: "From the beginning when I was establishing my realistic motives to render what I see, figurative is a narrative choice. Telling stories from and about the Chicana/o, or Chicanada, I address issues with conflict, contrast, humor, and the obvious urban spectacle–especially the ignored."

Valadez's Broadway Mural (1981, Peter Norton Foundation), an 8' X 60' foot mural, was formerly displayed on the first floor of the Victor Clothing Company building at 240 Broadway. One of the artist's best known works, it has been termed "his magnum opus." When he worked for the Community Redevelopment Agency, Valadez had photographed neighborhood people for five years. Broadway Mural is the culmination of that research.

Florencia Bazzano-Nelson says Valadez, in his Broadway Mural, "deploys a cinematic overview of a diverse slice of humanity, including the many people who found their way to this busy avenue: businessmen, gang members, elderly shoppers, folk dancers, movie-goers, and inquisitive children. Such crowded scenes were not uncommon on this street."

Broadway Mural was purchased by collector Peter Norton in 1981, when the unprofitable store closed down. His plan was to keep the mural's panels intact. The mural is now on loan to the RAND corporation in Santa Monica. Before Ramiro Salcedo arranged the sale of the Victor Clothing building in 2004, he donated several artworks in the store to MALDEF in 2002, including Valadez’s The Top Hat Bridal Mural.

In his 1989 pastel Two Vendors, Valadez "captures in photographic detail another fascinating view tying Latinos to Broadway's commercial and cultural ventures. Here two men compete for the attention of female shoppers on a sidewalk." As Jonathan Yorba points out, Valadez did not witness the two young men operating a business. Rather, they had passed each other on the street, and Valadez placed them in this situation. Bazzano-Nelson notes the reference to Gianlorenzo Bernini's sculpture Saint Teresa in Ecstasy in the ecstatic female heads at the top of the pastel. She calls this pastel a baroque matrix of minute details, textural differences, and bold colors.

Twelve of Valadez's early photographs have been purchased by the Museum of Contemporary Art in Los Angeles.

Three of Valadez's pastels were featured in the exhibition Ordinary People: Photorealism and the Work of Art since 1968 at The Museum of Contemporary Art, Los Angeles, in 2024-25.

== Selected works ==
- Broadway Mural, 1981, 8' X 60' feet, oil on canvas
- Getting Them Out of the Car, 1984, pastel on paper, 50 x 100.”
- White Roses, 1984, pastel on paper, 59.5 x 41.75.”
- Pool Party, 1987, 69 x 107,” oil on canvas.
- Two Vendors, 1989, pastel on paper. 209 x 128 cm.
- Revelations, 1991, 50 1/2 x 61, pastel on paper.
- Serape and Strings, 2001 pastel on paper.
- Car Show, 2001, oil on canvas, 76 x 96.25,
- Chevy Twins, 2006, pastel on paper, 50 x 76.

== Museum Solo Exhibitions ==
2012-2013 “Santa Ana Condition,” John M. Valadez , Museum of Contemporary Art, La Jolla, San Diego, Ca., National Mexican Museum of Art, Chicago, Vincent Price Museum, East Los Angeles College.

2001 “John Valadez Europa,” Carnegie Art Museum, Oxnard, CA.

2000 “John Valadez: La Frontera/The Border,” Carnegie Art Museum, Oxnard, CA.

1986 Museum of Contemporary Hispanic Art, New York, NY.

== Public Collections ==
Cheech Marin Center for Chicano Art and Culture, Riverside, CA

Brooklyn Museum, Brooklyn, NY

Carnegie Museum of Art, Oxnard, CA

Centre d’Art, Santa Monica, Barcelona, Spain

El Centro Cultural Tijuana, B.C., Mexico

El Paso Museum of Art, El Paso, TX

Gerald Buck Art Collection, University California Irvine, Orange County CA

Gruenwald Art Center at the Armand Hammer Museum

Los Angeles County Museum of Art

Museum of Contemporary Art, Los Angeles

Museum of Contemporary Art San Diego La Jolla, CA

University of Texas, Archer Huntington Gallery, Austin, TX

National Museum of Mexican Art, Chicago, IL

Mexican Museum, San Francisco, CA

Musee d’ Aquitaine, Bordeaux, France

New Mexico State University, Las Cruces, NM

Nora Eccles Harrison Museum of Art, Logan Utah

Santa Monica Museum of Art, Santa Monica, CA

Smithsonian American Art Museum, Washington, D.C.

UCI Institute and Museum for California Art Collection, Irvine CA

University of California at Los Angeles Research Library Dept. of Special Collections, Los Angeles, CA

University of New Mexico, Las Cruces, NM

University of Texas, Blanton Museum of Art, Austin, TX

== Awards ==
2024 Latinx Artist Fellowships, the U.S. Latinx Art Forum.

2017 Vincent and Mary Price Legacy Award, Vincent Price Art Museum, Los Angeles

2001 Grant, Joan Mitchell Foundation

1999 Art in Public Places Award, The Architecture Foundation of Orange County Federal Office Building and Courthouse, Santa Ana, CA

1996 General Service Administration (Design) Award, El Paso Federal Building

1994 Getty Fellowship Award, California Community Arts Foundation

1987 Artist in Residence, Foundation d’Art de la Napoule, France

== Books and Catalogs ==
Bazzano-Nelson, Florencia, in E. Carmen Ramos, ed. (2014). Our America: The Latino Presence in American Art. Washington, DC, London: Smithsonian American Art Museum; D Giles Limited, pp. 330–33.

Cordova, Ruben C. (2004). ¡Arte Caliente! Selections from the Joe A. Diaz Collection. Corpus Christi, TX: South Texas Institute for the Arts, pp. 36–37. ISBN 1-888581-03-4

Goldman, Shifra M., and Chon A. Noriega. (2015). Tradition and Transformation: Chicana/o Art from the 1970s through the 1990s. edited by C. Villaseñor Black. Los Angeles: UCLA Chicano Studies Research Center.

Griswold del Castillo, Richard, Teresa McKenna, and Yvonne Yarbro-Bejarano, eds. (1991). Chicano Art: Resistance and Affirmation, 1965-1985. Los Angeles: Wight Art Gallery, University of California, Los Angeles.

Keller, Gary D., Mary Erickson, Pat Villeneuve, Melanie Magisos, Craig Smith, and Mesa Southwest Museum. (2004). Chicano Art for Our Millennium: Collected Works from the Arizona State University Community. Tempe, Ariz.: Bilingual Press/Editorial Bilingüe.

Marin, Cheech, Max Benavidez, Constance Cortez, and Terecita Romo. (2002). Chicano Visions: American Painters on the Verge. Boston: Little, Brown and Co, pp. 126–133. ISBN 0821228064

Scorza, Cris, Cheech Marin, Museum of Contemporary Art, San Diego, Riverside Art Museum, Philbrook Museum of Art, and University of Wyoming Art Museum. (2016). Papel Chicano Dos : Works on Paper from the Collection of Cheech Marin.

The Santa Anna Condition: John Valadez. (2012). San Diego: Museum of Contemporary Art San Diego. ISBN 093441873X

Yorba, Jonathan, and Smithsonian American Art Museum. 2001. Arte Latino: Treasures from the Smithsonian American Art Museum. New York, [Washington, D.C.]: Watson-Guptill Publications; Smithsonian American Art Museum, pp. 102–3.
