= Ricardo Ruiz =

Ricardo Ruiz may refer to:

- Ricardo Ruiz (artist), Mexican-Cherokee artist
- Ricky Ruiz (born 1996), American soccer player
- Ricki Ruiz, member of the Oregon House of Representatives
