= Stephanie Godoy =

Mexican American oil paint artist

Stephanie Godoy (born 1992) is a Mexican American first generation oil paint artist.

== Biography ==
Godoy was born in El Monte, California in 1992. She grew up in Moreno Valley, California and that is where she is based at now as an artist. Godoy earned her bachelor's in Studio Arts in 2018 from California State University, Los Angeles. Godoy has exhibitions at the Getty Museum, Plaza De La Raza, Riverside Art Museum, The Cheech Center, and Self-Help Graphics. Godoy is going to be hosting a free “Light Catcher Family Workshop: Getty,” February 11, 2024, at the Getty Center.

== Notable works ==
- Godoy is featured in Indigenous Futurism Exhibition at The Cheech Marin Center for Chicano Art & Culture in Riverside, California 2023 and the Root Exhibition for the Art Share Los Angeles Art Gallery 2023
- In honor of the Black Lives Matter Protests following the murder of George Floyd and tribute to the LGBTQ+, Godoy contributed hand painted protest posters for the Protest in Peace Exhibition at SoLA Contemporary Los Angeles Art Gallery 2020
- Art displayed at the Getty Center Museum and The Cultural Art and Education Center La Plaza de la Raza
- Art galleries Self Help Graphics and Art, The Los Angeles Art Show have exhibited her art, as well as the California African American Museum
- Created community murals for Music Festivals Viva!, Desert Daze, and Echo Park Rising.
