= Carlotta Corpron =

American photographer (1901–1988)

- Carlotta Corpron
- Born: December 9, 1901; Blue Earth, Minnesota
- Died: April 17, 1988 (aged 86); Denton, Texas
- Known for: Photography
- Notable work: Solarized Calla Lilies (1948)
- Movement: Abstract photography

Carlotta Corpron (December 9, 1901 – April 17, 1988) was an American photographer known for her abstract compositions featuring light and reflections, made mostly during the 1940s and 1950s. She is considered a pioneer of American abstract photography and a key figure in Bauhaus-influenced photography in Texas.

== Biography ==
Corpron was born in Blue Earth, Minnesota. Her father, Alexander Corpron, was a doctor, and he moved the family to India, where he served as a medical missionary. She attended a "strict English boarding school" located in the Himalayan mountains.

After spending most of her youth in India, she returned to the United States in 1920 to study art at Michigan State Normal College, where she earned a B.S. in art education in 1925. She went on to study fabric design and art education at Columbia University's Teachers College, gaining her master's degree the following year.

Corpron supported herself as an art teacher, first at the Women's College of Alabama (1926–1928; now Huntingdon College) and then at the University of Cincinnati's School of Applied Art (1928–1935). Corpron bought her first camera in 1933. In 1935, she took a job teaching photography, design, and art history at the Texas State College for Women, (currently known as Texas Woman's University) in Denton. At the Texas State College for Women, Corpron was an Associate Professor of Art from 1935 to 1968. She taught advertising, design, and art history. She first used a camera to document student artwork. Corpron's teaching and "photographic vision" had a large influence on the next generation of photographers who brought techniques to Texas that hadn't been seen before. One of her students there was Ida Lansky. Corpron also influenced another Texas avant-garde photographer, Barbara Maples.

Of teaching, Corpron said: ″I am one of the fortunate individuals in this world whose vocation and avocation merge. I love teaching above all else, and I have found that as I have developed as a creative photographer, the work of my students has become more interesting.″

Corpron was involved in the Little Chapel in the Woods project at the Texas State College for Women (now known as Texas Woman's University) and was the documentarian for the project, taking photos of the building, students, and faculty as they worked on designing and installing the work.

She retired from teaching in 1968 and died in Denton in 1988.

== Photography ==
In the summer of 1936, Corpron decided to refine her photographic techniques at the Art Center in Los Angeles in preparation for teaching a photography course. Her earliest photographic work known as her "Nature Studies", was a continuation of the experimentation she began in Cincinnati. In work such as the Coral and Starfish (1944) she focused on the abstraction and patterns of natural forms. In works such as, Design with Oil Tank (1942), Corpron would manipulate images to accentuate geometric forms by overlapping negatives. With the support of the art department at Texas Woman's University and her students, Corpron began to further her inventive studies.

In 1933, Corpron took up black-and-white photography and was initially interested in it as tool for taking photographs of natural forms for use in textile design courses. Her highly abstract aesthetic was influenced by the photograms of Man Ray and László Moholy-Nagy, who visited Denton in 1942 to teach a light workshop. Around the same time, the artist György Kepes came to Denton to write a book, and he helped expand her repertoire, introducing Corpron to a range of modernist techniques including double exposures and solarization.

She is best known for several series that have been termed "light-poetry" and which she called "Light Drawings" in which she investigated light as a central subject. She made a number of light paintings by tracking the movement of lights at amusement parks, and another group of images centered on distorted reflections of objects like eggs. There is also a series of images, "Light Patterns," made by photographing the play of light on sheets of paper suspended inside a custom-designed box. She also experimented with solarization and with ferrotype plates. Her imaginative and "ultramodern" investigations of light broke new ground in photographic technique and established her reputation as a pioneer of American abstract photography and a leader of what one scholar has termed the "Texas Bauhaus."

Kepes became a great admirer of Corpron's work and included some of her photographs in his influential 1944 textbook The Language of Vision. Another admirer of her work in this period was Alfred Stieglitz, who planned to exhibit her work but died before he could do so. During the 1940s and early 1950s, she had a number of solo shows at prestigious museums and galleries and was included in the Museum of Modern Art's "Abstraction in Photography" exhibition (New York, 1952).

In the 1950s, Corpron's production fell off due to ill health and straitened finances. However, in 1975, her work was included in the San Francisco Museum of Art's landmark exhibition "Women of Photography: An Historical Survey," which led to a resurgence of interest in her work. Throughout the 1970s and 1980s, she was included in exhibitions at a number of museums and galleries, and today her work is held in the collections of MOMA (New York), the Art Institute of Chicago, the Dallas (Texas) Museum of Art, the Museum of Contemporary Photography (Chicago), and other art institutions.

Her personal archives are in the collection of the Amon Carter Museum of American Art in Texas.

Corpron's work was included in the 2021 exhibition Women in Abstraction at the Centre Pompidou.

== Selected exhibitions ==
- Texas Bauhaus, El Paso Museum of Art (2006)
- Carlotta Corpron: Designer with Light, Amon Carter Museum of American Art (1980)
- Works on Paper: Southwest 1978, Dallas Museum of Art (1978)
- Form and Light: 1942-1949, Marcuse Pfeifer Gallery (1977)
- Women in Photography: An Historical Survey, San Francisco Museum of Modern Art (1975)
- Abstraction in Photography, Museum of Modern Art (1952)
- Captured Light, Dallas Museum of Fine Arts (1948)
