= Anna Jaquez =

American sculptor

Anna Jaquez (born 1953) is an American artist, art professor and metalsmith. She lives and works in El Paso, Texas. Jaquez is an art professor at the University of Texas at El Paso (UTEP). She has work in the permanent collection of the El Paso Museum of Art.

== Early life ==
Jaquez' father was a builder who added onto their house frequently. Jaquez later attended the University of Texas at El Paso.

Jaquez still draws inspiration from the use of odd materials that her father incorporated into his building.

== Work ==
Jaquez' work explores the interplay of small, detailed items within larger scale structures. Gaspar Enriquez, who Jaquez met as a graduate student at the University of Texas at El Paso (UTEP) in the late 1980s, was an influence on her as a teacher. She also interprets the poetry of Pat Mora in her metal work. Other influences include using her own life and childhood as inspiration, including her Mexican-American culture in her art. Jaquez feels that her work in art helped her to become "proud of her Mexican heritage."

Jaquez made art jewelry for many years before becoming a large-scale sculptor. She "started out working at her kitchen table where she could carve out a place for her creative expression in the context of her domestic responsibilities."
