= Elena Asins =

Spanish artist, writer, lecturer and critic

- Born: Elena Asins Rodriguez; 2 March 1940; Madrid, Spain
- Died: 14 December 2015; Azpirotz, Navarra, Spain
- Education: Universidad Autonoma de Madrid, New School for Social Research, Columbia University
- Known for: Painting, drawing, sculpture, poetry writing
- Awards: Gold Medal of Fine Arts, Spain; National Award for Plastic Arts, Spain

Elena Asins Rodríguez (Madrid, 2 March 1940 – Azpirotz, Navarra, 14 December 2015) was a prominent visual artist, writer, lecturer and critic. Her plastic language was based on computer systematic calculation. Asins pioneered the convergence between theoretical computer science and the minimal and geometrical tendencies of the 1960s. She belongs to the first generation of artists using computers to generate art.

== Life and career ==
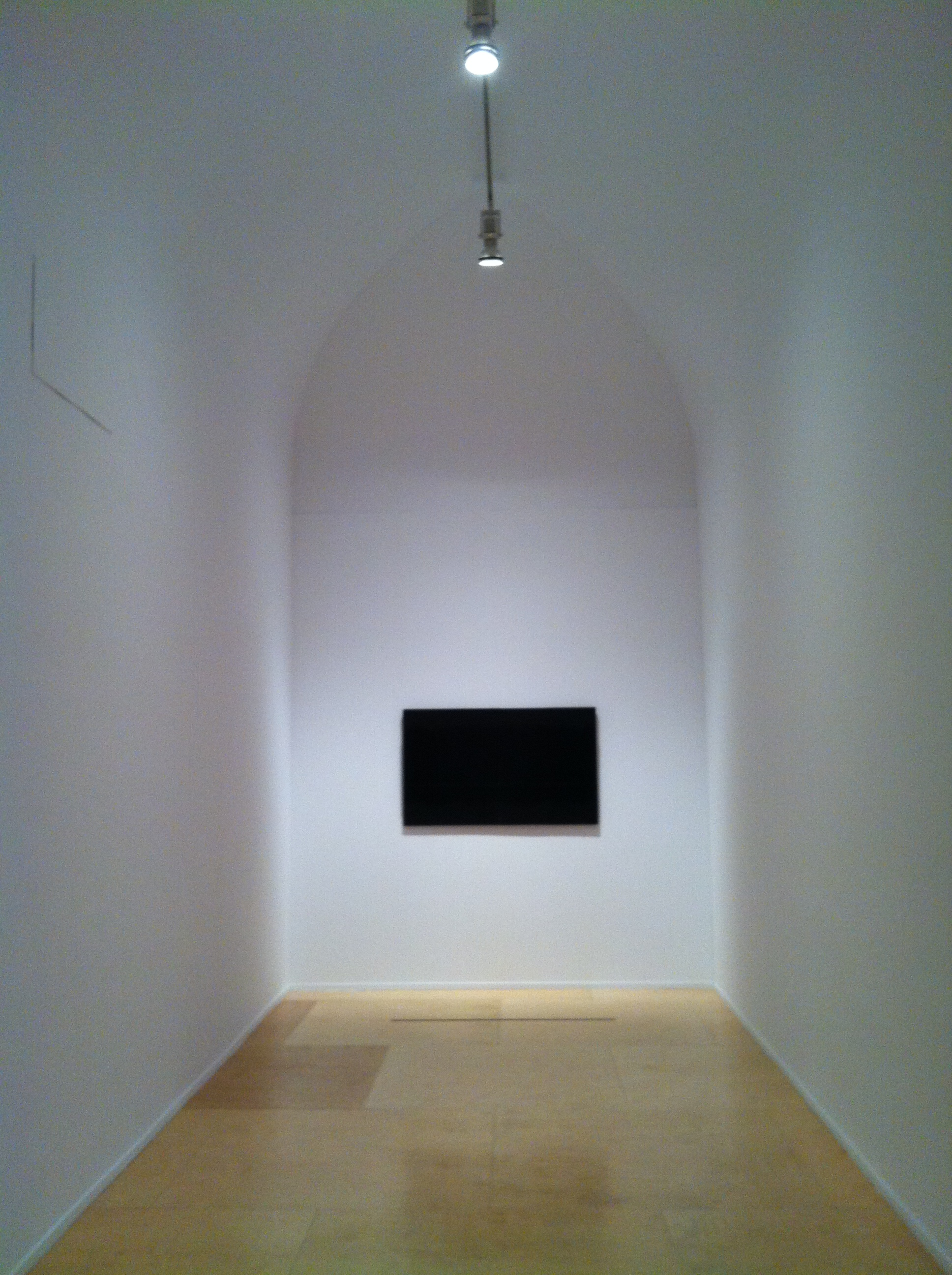
Interior views of Museo Reina Sofia

Asins' artistic research was initially linked to the experimental circles that emerged in Spain during the final decades of the Francoist dictatorship. Among these groups was the Cooperativa de Producción Artística y Artesana (Cooperative of Art and Crafts), where fine arts formed a whole with poetry, linguistics, music, and architecture. The Centro de Cálculo (Computer Center) of the Universidad Autónoma de Madrid, active between 1966 and 1982, was another important group where Asins pioneered the genre of Computer art. To her initial experiences in Spain, Elena Asins extended her artistic and intellectual research in centers such as the University of Stuttgart, Columbia University and the New School for Social Research in New York. In these institutions, she studied the theoretic computational aesthetic of Max Bense, the linguistic theories of Noam Chomsky, the music of Mozart and mystical texts from the Old and New Testament to Wittgenstein's philosophy

In conversation with art historian Joan Robledo-Palop, the artist explains the foundation of her aesthetic:

I work on white paper with black lines or on black paper with white lines; these have been my first works. It was a work where I was searching for myself, but it was so long ago that I almost cannot recall. I started working with abstraction when I was 23 years old. Additionally, what interests me is the essence of the structure, to have in my hand the base of all possible construction. Naturally, colors do not give you this kind of understanding; that is something that is provided by a structure, which let's say is a way of organizing the world. The organization of elements that produce a world; it produces an aesthetic. It is a play in a Wittgensteinian sense that reveals the truth or the logic of things.

== Awards and reception ==
In 2006, Elena Asins received the Gold Medal of Fine Arts from the Government of Spain, and in 2011 the National Award for Plastic Arts. In 2011, the Museo Reina Sofia in Madrid presented the most comprehensive exhibition of the artist entitled Elena Asins: Fragmentos de la memoria. In 2017, the exhibition traveled to the Museo de las Artes de la Universidad de Guadalajara, Mexico.

== Monumental works ==
Since the 1980s, Asins devoted an important effort to public sculpture. Examples of her work are permanently installed in the Museo al Aire Libre (Fuengirola, Malaga), Vitoria (Alava), Berantevilla (Alava), and Zarautz (Gipuzkoa), where she created Canons 22, one of her most monumental works installed in front of the seascape.

== Collections ==
Asins' work is represented in many permanent collections across the world. The Reina Sofia Museum in Madrid has the largest body of work in a public collection, since the museum became the recipient of her estate and personal archive in 2015. Work in other public collections include the Spanish Institute in New York, Kulturboherde (Hamburg), Institut Valencia d'Art Modern – IVAM (Valencia), Museo de Bellas Artes de Alava (Vitoria), Fundacion March (Madrid), Archivo Lafuente (Santander), Fundacion Chirivella Soriano, (Valencia), Collection Leonora and Jimmy Belilty (Caracas, Venezuela), Cisneros Fontanals Art Foundation, CIFO (Miami, FL) and The Tanya Capriles de Brillembourg Collection (USA) among many others.

Asins work was included in the 2021 exhibition Women in Abstraction at the Centre Pompidou.
