= Gaspar Enriquez =

American artist (born 1942)

- Born: 1942 (age 83–84); El Paso, Texas, U.S.
- Education: University of Texas at El Paso; New Mexico State University
- Notable work: La Rosa Dolorosa de Mi Vida Loca, 1995

Gaspar Enriquez (born 1942) is an American artist known for creating photorealist portraits, primarily of people of Chicano heritage. He uses the airbrush technique in his paintings. Enriquez is also a sculptor and a jewelry maker who works in metal.

According to the Museum of Art in Las Cruces, New Mexico, Enríquez "has been at the forefront of the national Chicano art movement for over fifty years," and his realistic portraits "show the humanity of the El Paso Chicano community and the tensions they face when living in a two-culture environment." Enríquez’s Chicano heritage "reflects his life experiences, the urban environment, and the people of his hometown. His compassionate nature allows him to capture his subject’s humanity and forces the viewer to look deeply at his subjects."

== Early life ==
Enriquez was born in 1942 in the El Segundo Barrio neighborhood of El Paso, Texas. He attended the University of Texas at El Paso, graduating with a bachelor's degree in arts education. He then went on to attend New Mexico State University, where he studied metalwork and graduated with a master's degree.

== Career ==
His artistic influences included Mel Casas and Luis Jimenez, both prominent artist from El Paso. Enriquez's paintings are usually made with acrylic paint on paper, canvas, or board supports. His sculptures are made with metal.

Enriquez's work has drawn inspiration from his students at Bowie High School in El Paso, Texas, where he was a teacher for 32 years, from 1971-2023. Many of his students served as models for his paintings, some of which are very large in scale.

Enríquez began painting with airbrush in the 1980s, and these paintings "celebrate cultural traditions from Mexico such as the charreada and baile folklorico or folk dances, while his skill as a metal smith can be seen in his Familia Album, a book-like work that contains etched reproductions of childhood photographs. Enriquez began making cut out, life-sized portraits in the 1990s that were painted in black and white, which he said "characterized life in the barrio conditioned by deprivation, lack of hope and difficulty in achieving their potential." He gradually produced multi-figure groups. Enriquez typically renders these figures with non-smiling faces, tattoos, sunglasses, and crossed arms that are often interpreted as "belligerent stances" that the artist regards as authentic components of the “barrio attitude.” His commission for 25-foot high portraits inside the San Antonio Convention Center was almost lost when the artist "refused to make his figures appear friendlier." He explained: “You wouldn’t smile if you did the things these kids often have to do just to survive.”

Enriquez divides his work into six categories: depictions of artists, images from the barrio, charro (Mexican Rodeo), people with tattoos, sculpture, public art (often paintings on board).

Enriquez is surrounded by people with tattoos. He refers to his many tattooed subjects as "part of my familia of portraits.” Some of them now own tattoo shops of their own. His tattoo portraits run the gamut from very rudimentary tattoos made in prison to the work of very accomplished tattoo artists, such as the one depicted in De Puro Corazón (2020). Her body is covered with complex, interwoven tattoos made by her follow artists. Charolito, on view at the Cheech Marin Center for Chicano Art in Riverside, CA, in 2022-2023, is a unique case, because it is the only tattoo that the artist invented. According to Enriquez, Charolito (as the young woman was nicknamed) was a great Surrealist artist in the vein of Dalí, but her mother crushed her spirit by destroying her drawings because she considered them to be the work of the devil. As a protective device, Enriquez rendered a faux tattoo of a sad but protective Virgin of Sorrows on Charolito's back. It shows a virgin who understands pain because her heart is pierced by seven swords: she views Charolito with sympathetic eyes and extends a friendly hand. The Virgin deliberately resembles Charolito.

After his retirement from teaching, Enriquez has continued to concentrate on art making and on restoring historic adobe structures, including the 400-year-old presidio of San Elizario in El Paso's Mission Valley, in which he is creating artist's studios.

Enriquez had a retrospective at the El Paso Museum called "Gaspar Enríquez: Metaphors of El Barrio" in 2014. It featured over fifty paintings, prints and sculptures, dating from 1983 - 2013. The catalogue is published by the El Paso Museum.

In 2023, he had a retrospective at the Museum of Art in Las Cruces, New Mexico called "Gaspar Enríquez: Chicano Pride, Chicano Soul."

A 2016 portrait of Rudolfo Anaya created by Enriquez is held in the collections of the National Portrait Gallery in Washington, D.C.

Examples of Enriquez's work can be found in Cheech Marin's collection of Chicano art housed at The Cheech Marin Center for Chicano Art, Culture & Industry.

== Personal life ==
Enriquez lives in San Elizario, Texas.

== Awards ==
Father Rahm Segundo Barrio Person of the Year Award, 2016

Distinguished Alumni, University of Texas at El Paso, 2015

McDonald's Hispanos Triunfadores—Arts & Entertainment, 2003

Siqueiros-Pollock Aware, 1996

== One Person Exhibitions ==
"Gaspar Enríquez: Chicano Pride, Chicano Soul," Museum of Art in Las Cruces, New Mexico, 2023

"Gaspar Enríquez: Metaphors of El Barrio," El Paso Museum of Art, 2014

"Ignite: Artist Portraits," Gerald Ruben Center for the Visual Arts, El Paso, TX, 2014

"Una Pagina Mas," The Gallery at University of Texas at Arlington, 2007; Tucson Museum of Art, 2006; Patricia Correia Gallery, Santa Monica, CA, 2006-2007;

"Mis Homies," The Ice House Cultural Center, 2006

"De Puro Corazon," Adair Margo Gallery, 2004

== Works ==
Generations of Attitudes, 1992, acrylic on fiberglass board (airbrush) 6 x 15 feet, El Paso Museum of Art.

Tirando Tiempo (Doing Time), 1992, acrylic on board, 48 x 36 inches.

La Rosa Dolorosa de Mi Vida Loca, 1995, mixed media installation, 10 x 8 x 4 feet.

Tirando Rollo (I Love You) (triptych) 1999, acrylic on paper.

Elegy on the Death of César Chávez, 2000, acrylic on paper (airbrush), 36 x 48 inches, El Paso Museum of Art.

Color Harmony en la Esquina, 2002, acrylic on aluminum panels (airbrush), 24 x 24 feet, San Antonio Convention Center.

Baseball Murals, acrylic on porcelain, 9 murals, ranging from 8 x 6 feet to 8 x 10 feet, Chihuahua Baseball Stadium, El Paso, TX.

== Collections ==
Albuquerque Museum Of Art and History

The Cheech Marin Center for Chicano Art & Culture of the Riverside Art Museum, Riverside California.

Crystal Bridges Museum Of American Art

de Young Museum, Fine Arts Museum of San Francisco

El Paso Museum Of Art

Lyndon Baines Johnson Library and Museum

New Mexico State University

National Portrait Gallery, Smithsonian Institution, Washington, D.C.

Hispanic Writer’s Collection, Texas State University

Tucson Museum Of Art

== Website ==
http://gasparenriquez.com/about.html
