= Julie Bozzi =

American artist

Julie Bozzi (born 1943) is an American artist who is known for her landscape paintings. Bozzi currently lives in Fort Worth, Texas. Bozzi's art is in the permanent collection of the Modern Art Museum of Fort Worth, The Brooklyn Museum, Hirshhorn Museum and Sculpture Garden, and the El Paso Museum of Art.

== Biography ==
Bozzi was born in California and went to graduate school at the University of California, Davis. She began to paint en plein air in 1975. She later moved to Texas in 1980.

She was married to the artist Vernon Fisher until his death in 2023.

== Work ==
Bozzi is known for her landscapes. She finds much of her inspiration for her landscape paintings during drives along interstate highways, country roads and city streets across the United States. She uses her steering wheel as her easel and paints with a variety of media including oil, watercolor and gouache on different types of surfaces. Bozzi's interpretation of landscape is non-traditional and the natural world she paints is "dehumanized" and "collected" like a specimen. Another reviewer, Paul Richard, compared her "clinical detachment and attention to the seen" as qualities that would have "pleased John Ruskin." The sense of collecting the landscape and her attention to detail has been attributed to her working as a laboratory assistant and scientific illustrator at Stanford University. Her paintings are rarely larger than four by ten inches and she prefers a somber palette. Her landscape choices are often considered unusual and can be anything from a "desolate strip of land along a highway to rubble from a freshly dug grave in a cemetery." These often overlooked areas of the American landscape is brought to life through Bozzi's "interplay of light and color."

Bozzi is also known for her food art. These pieces are preserved or reproduced food items using wood, plaster, paint and clay which have been "enshrined beneath glass." Bozzi also paints realistic images of foods, such as doughnuts and pan de muerto.
