= Twofold movement =

Coordinates: 47.4911°N 19.0628°E

- Kétféle mozgás (Hungarian)
- Artist: Ilona Keserü Ilona
- Year: 1980
- Type: oil on canvas and textile
- Dimensions: 210 cm × 200 cm (83 in × 79 in)
- Location: Hungarian National Museum, Budapest

Twofold movement (in Hungarian: Kétféle mozgás) is a work of art by Hungarian artist Ilona Keserü Ilona from 1980 to 1992.

== Description ==
Its dimensions are 210 x 200 cm. This experimental work consists of two parts. The upper part contains strips of raw textiles stacked wave sewn on canvas painted with white oil paints. The lower part is oil painting on canvas, the surface is occupied by abstract black ink. The picture is part of the collection of the Hungarian National Museum in Budapest, Hungary.

== Analysis ==
The work interfaces between two-dimensionality and three-dimensionality. Since the late 1960s the artist conducted experiments to look for new ideas. Often uses textiles to emphasize spatial nature of its work. The contrast between the use of textiles and abstract expressionism emphasizes the opposition of male and female means of expression in art
