= Einar and Jamex de la Torre =

Team of sibling artists

Einar de la Torre Jamex de la Torre
- Education: Cal State Long Beach
- Known for: Glass art

Einar and Jamex de la Torre, also known as the de la Torre Brothers are a sibling team of glass artists. The brothers were born in Guadalajara, Mexico; Jamex in 1960, and Einar in 1963. They live and work between the Guadalupe Valley of Baja California, Mexico and San Diego, California.

== Early life and education ==
In 1972, the de la Torre family moved from Mexico to a small town in Southern California. When they were in Mexico the brothers were schooled at a traditional Catholic institution. In California they attended college at Cal State Long Beach. In 1983, Jamex received a BFA degree in the field of sculpture.

== Work ==
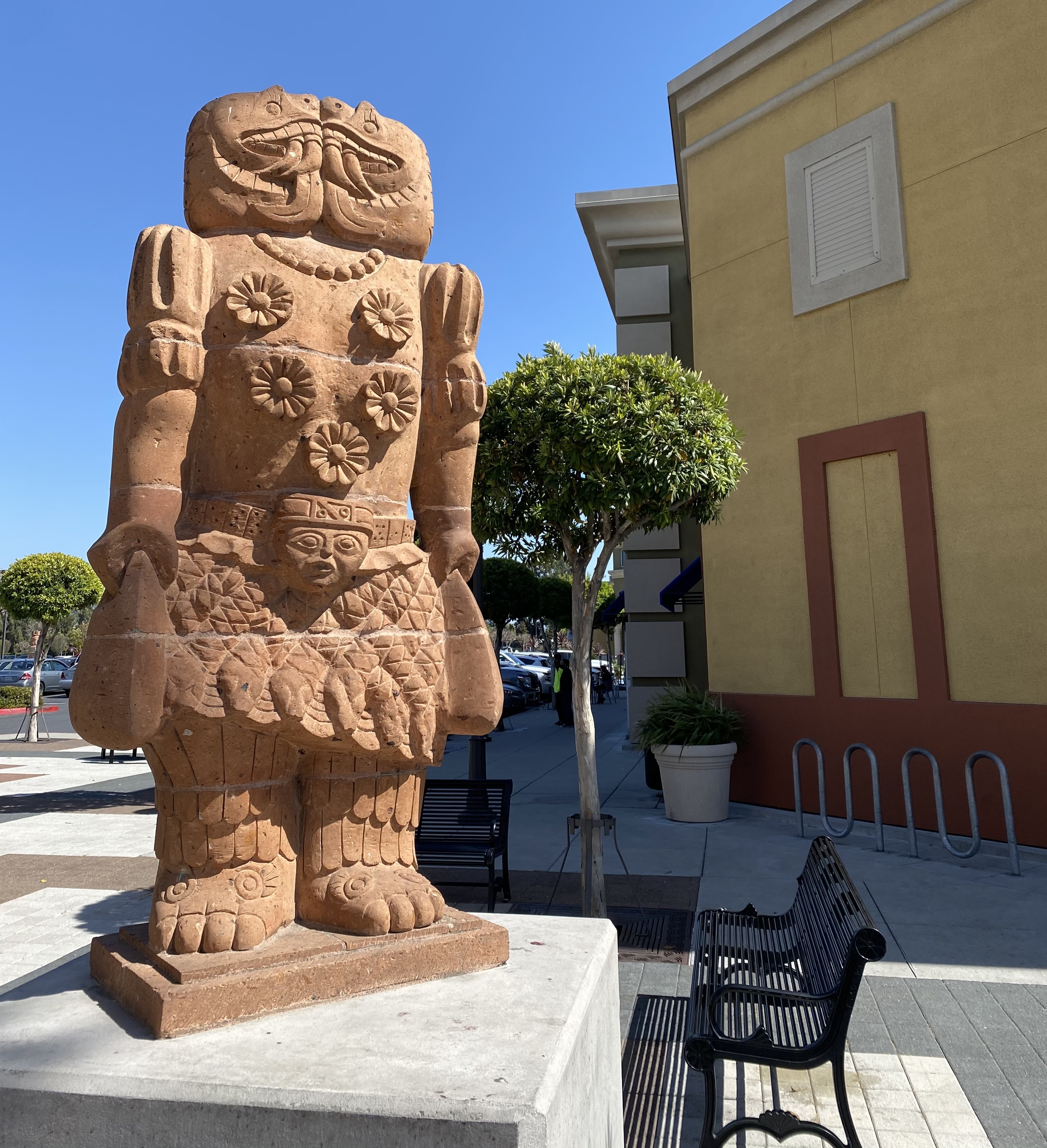
Coatlicue statue in San Jose, California.

Using a diversity of material (including appropriated objects) and techniques, the team works primarily in blown-glass. They have also done work with lenticular printing technology, including the permanent installation Gaiatlicue at The Cheech Marin Center for Chicano Art & Culture of the Riverside Art Museum. Gaiatlicue combines the Aztec life/death goddess Coatlicue (fashioned primarily out of vintage low rider automobile parts) with the Greek earth goddess Gaia (fashioned out of flora and fauna).

Their work was presented in a retrospective travelling exhibition called Collidoscope: de la Torre Brothers Retro-Perspective, organized by the National Museum of the American Latino of the Smithsonian Institution. It premiered at The Cheech Marin Center for Chicano Art & Culture of the Riverside Art Museum and travelled to the Corning Museum of Glass, among other venues. Works in that exhibition include Colonial Atmosphere (2002), an installation that imagines pre-Columbian cultures landing on the Moon. References are made to both Christian and Indigenous myths, as well as to the politics of colonization. A number of works in the exhibition were based on the Aztec Stone of the Sun (a.k.a. The Calendar Stone), the most imposing of these was La Belle Epoch (the beautiful age), 2002, which utilized the Stone of the Sun as a ferris wheel that pours "blood" into a canoe at its base. Other works include Tula Frontera Norte based on the Atlantid figures from the Toltec site of Tula, and Critical Mass (2002).

Their 2023 exhibition, Post-Columbian Futurism, at the Institute of Contemporary Art, San Diego, deployed an intermixture of Indigenous, Mexican and American cultural icons to address issues of over-consumption within these cultures. In the same year they created a large scale lobby installation at the McNay Art Museum.

The show, de la Torre Brothers: Upward Mobility was presented by the McNay Art Museum in 2024. It featured glass sculptures, lenticular prints, and the largest version of the installation Le Point de Bascule (The Tipping Point) to date. The content of the work addressed overconsumption/overdevelopment, global warming, and environmental degradation.

== Collections ==
Their work is represented in the permanent collections of the San Diego Museum of Art, ASU Art Museum, the Corning Museum of Glass, the Tucson Museum of Art among other institutions.
