= The Cheech Marin Center for Chicano Art & Culture =

American academic center and art museum

The Cheech Marin Center for Chicano Art & Culture of the Riverside Art Museum
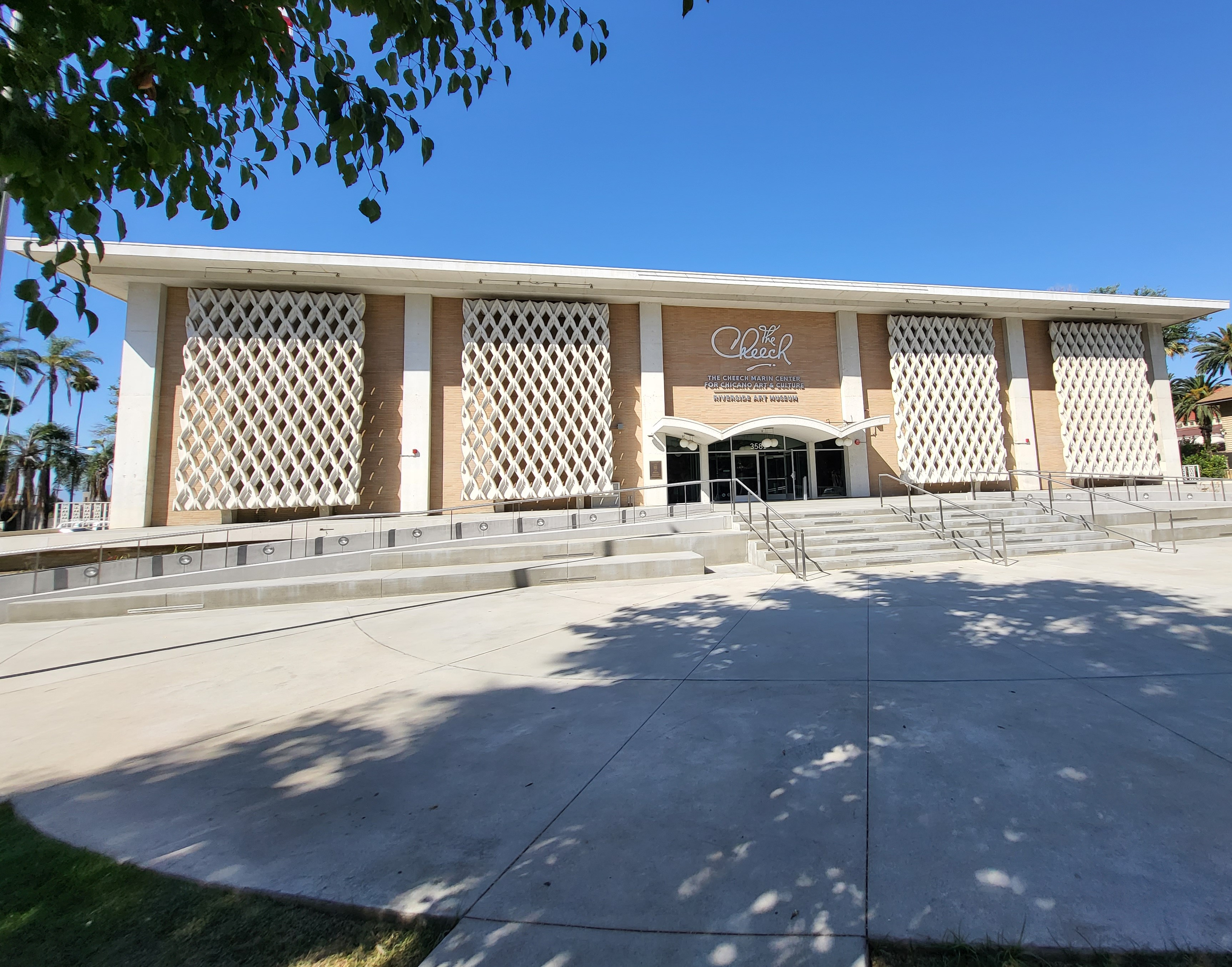

- Location within California Location within the United States
- Former name: Riverside Public Library
- Established: June 18, 2022
- Location: 3581 Mission Inn Ave; Riverside, California; United States
- Coordinates: 33.9829°N 117.3716°W
- Type: Art museum
- Architects: Ficks & Ficks, 1964
- Website: The Cheech Marin Center for Chicano Art & Culture

The Cheech Marin Center for Chicano Art & Culture, known as The Cheech, is a museum in Riverside, California. It is part of the larger Riverside Art Museum. The center is focused on the exhibition and study of Chicano art from across the United States. This is a collaborative effort between Cheech Marin, the City of Riverside and Riverside Art Museum. Cheech Marin is a stand-up comedian, actor, writer, and collector. He has donated or promised his collection of more than 700 pieces of Chicano art. Riverside provides the old Riverside public library to house the collection and the Riverside Art Museum manages the center. The Cheech strives to be a world-class institution for the research and study of "all things [related to] Chicano art". It is the first North American museum facility dedicated exclusively to Mexican-American and Chicano art.

== Center location, funding, and architecture ==
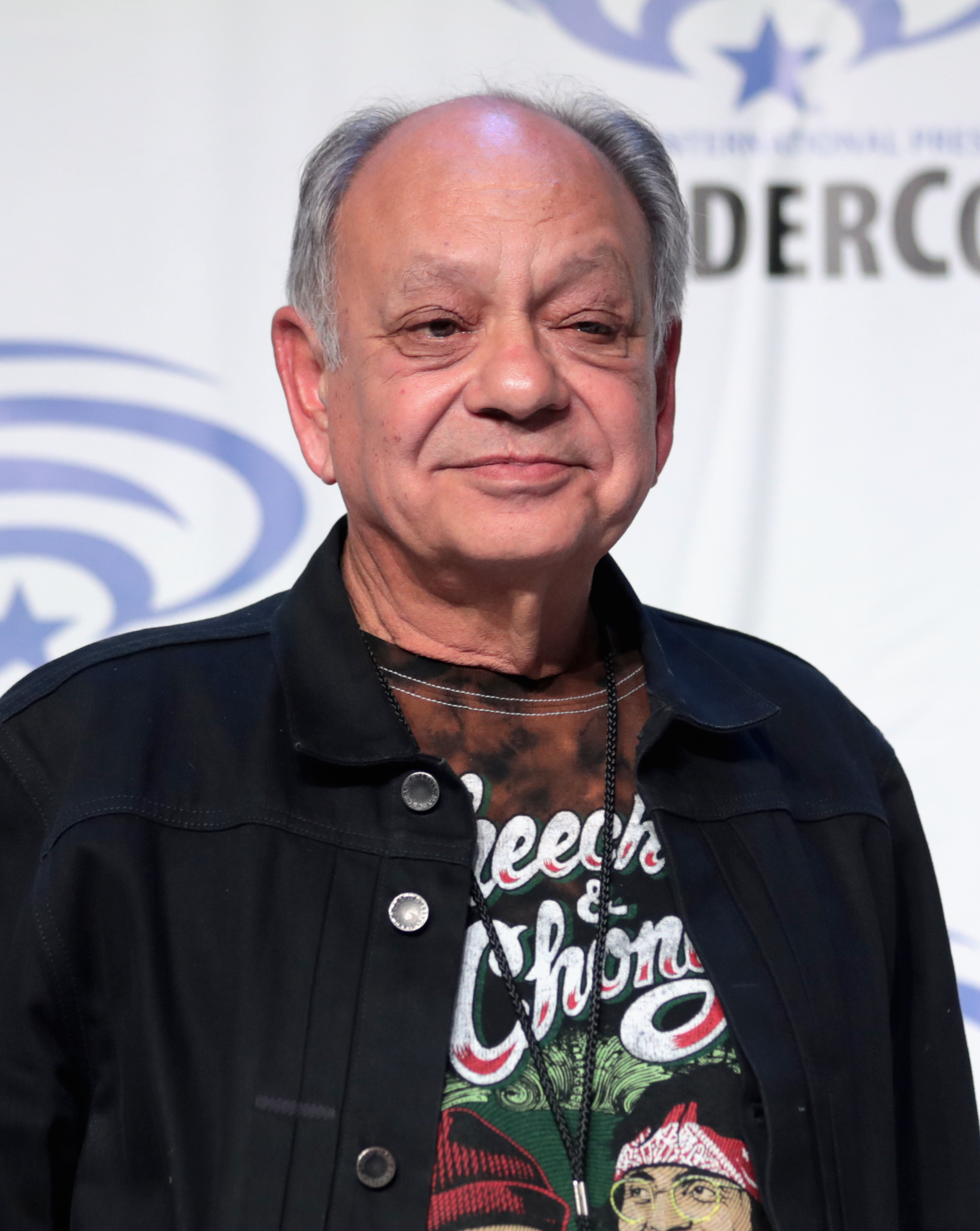
Cheech Marin

After a successful exhibit of some of Marin's collection at the Riverside Art Museum in early 2017, the city and museum approached Marin about establishing a permanent home for his collection in Riverside. The idea of keeping the collection intact appealed to Marin. The city's emphasis on history, art and culture, as well as the large Latino population in the area, and the proximity to five universities, were also appealing. With two of the universities, the University of California, Riverside, and California State University, San Bernardino, already offering Chicana/o studies programs, Marin was convinced Riverside was the right location.

A fundraising campaign, named "Reach for the Cheech", was started in 2017. After receiving a $600,000 pledge from the Riverside-based Altura Credit Union, the campaign was able to meet its initial fundraising goal of three million dollars on May 29, 2018. Shortly after Altura's commitment, the State of California included in its budget an additional $9.7 million to assist with the development of the center, which accounts for more than two-thirds of the money needed for the renovations. In December 2019, the Bank of America made a $750,000 commitment, bringing the total raised to almost $14 million.

The center, which Marin dubbed "The Cheech", is housed in what was the main branch of the city of Riverside's library system, a 61,420 square feet (5,706 m^{2}) facility located close to the historic The Mission Inn Hotel & Spa. Designed by Moise, Harbach & Hewlitt, the original New Formalist building is modern and also influenced by classical architecture. Opened in 1964, It has two main floors and a basement. While the new (now completed) downtown library was under construction a few blocks away, the books were moved out of the old library building. It underwent extensive renovation by the firm Page & Turnbull (in consultation with the cultural specialists wHY Architecture) to repurpose the library for its new role as an art museum and academic center. The exterior features eight 17 ton concrete screens with diamond-patterns. Each diamond terminates in a dove. "These doves express a hope for peace during one of the hottest periods of the Cold War."

To create a reception area for individuals and groups, an atrium was carved out near the entrance. In order to create a dramatic backdrop that frames this atrium, glass artists Einar and Jamex de la Torre were commissioned to make a large-scale (26 x 13-foot) permanent installation. Their work, which shifts shapes as one moves in front of it, is called Gaiatlicue. Its primary image combines the Greco-Roman goddesses Gaia and the Aztec goddess Coatlicue. These shifting images are constructed out of flora, fauna, and sections from low rider cars. Gaiatlicue references climate change and the challenges it poses to life on earth.

== Mission and goals ==
Rotating selections of work held by the center are exhibited in the permanent collection galleries. A community gallery for local artists is near the entrance. The second floor is for major traveling exhibitions. The first exhibit was dedicated to the de la Torre brothers, primarily known as glass sculptors. The center generates scholarship though exhibitions, catalogues, lectures, films, and other activities. The staff leads group tours that include school children. Internships with students from local colleges provide training to future museum professionals. Marin and local officials hope The Cheech will spark a cultural renaissance in Riverside.

== Museum collection ==
The initial collection, donated or promised by Cheech Marin, consists of over 700 paintings, drawings, prints, mixed media, sculptures and photography assembled over the past 30 years. The collection covers a range of Chicano art types. Some reflect the rasquachismo aesthetic, which has grown in popularity. Marin came to fame in the 1970s as part of the comedy duo Cheech & Chong. He is noted for having one of the largest and most important private collections of Chicano art in the world. The Center is expanding its holdings beyond Marin's collection. Two Judithe Hernández works were bought with endowment funds and included in the inaugural exhibition "Cheech Collects": Juárez Quinceañera, 2017 (pastel and mixed media on canvas), and Santa Desconocida, 2016 (pastel on paper).

== Exhibitions ==
=== Cheech Collects, 2022-23 ===
Cheech Collects, June 18, 2022 – May 14, 2023, was the inaugural exhibition of the permanent collection. It featured 120 works, almost all from Marin's collection, primarily artists from California (especially Los Angeles) and Texas.

A reviewer selected the following works as Texas highlights. Vincent Valdez's oil painting Kill the Pachuco Bastards from 2001, is a powerful treatment of the Zoot Suit Riots that took place in Los Angeles in 1943, when servicemen (primarily sailors) attacked Pachucos with batons and stripped their Zoot Suits from their bodies. A trio of paintings by Cesar Martinez included the 2000 version of his Hombre que le Gustan las Mujeres, a mixed-up man with tattoos of the Virgin of Guadalupe, a nearly naked pin-up girl, and an idealized "good" girl. Rubio's La Lechuza (2001) depicts the mythical owl woman that appeared to him, to warn him away from an area in which he was later almost killed by a drive-by shooter. Adan Hernandez was represented by a trio of oil paintings that reflect his dark and violent "Chicano Noir" style: La Bomba, 1992; Drive-by Asesino, 1992; and La Sad Girl, 2003. Candelario Aguilar, Jr. was represented by El Verde, 2020, a mixed media panel that is so reworked with layered imagery that it is almost abstract. An almost-buried assault rifle in the center provides a note of menace. Benito Huerta's Exile off Main Street, 1999, is a reworking of Pablo Picasso's Les Demoiselles de Avignon. Gaspar Enriquez's Charolito, 2009, features a young woman who was discouraged from pursuing an artistic career because her mother destroyed her art, which she considered to be satanic. The artist provided her with a protective tattoo.

Works singled out by a critic as exhibition highlights by California artists include the two Judithe Hernández pieces noted above. Two works by Glugio “Gronk” Nicandro, La Tormenta Returns, 1998, and Pérdida (ACCENT ON THE e), 2000, were prominently featured near the entrance. The former was painted live during a performance of a string quartet and the soprano nicknamed Tormenta. According to the artist, it has dramatic, operatic, and filmic properties. Pérdida's (Lost) title is derived from a vintage melodramatic Mexican film. The work's sculptural forms are stand-ins for people. George Yepes' La Pistola y el Corazón (2000) is a large reworking of his most famous painting (the original was destroyed in a fire.) Carlos Almaraz's Sunset Crash, 1982, is a prime example of his most famous motif. The violent crashes take place against a beautifully colored backdrop. In his 1984 pastel, Getting Them Out of the Car, John Valadez portrays daily urban violence with religious and political martyrdom. Frank Romero’s large scale Arrest of the Palateros is a humorous treatment of police overkill as they arrest vendors. Eloy Torrez's It’s a Brown World After All is a portrait of Cheech Marin wearing a six pointed crown representing a time machine that travels backwards connecting the subject to his ancestral past. Two small scale paintings by Ana Teresa Fernández, To Press I and To Press II, 2007, feature the artist engaging in a virtual tango with an ironing board, the light coming in from the window, and her photographer as part of a project that addresses virgin/whore and clean/dirty dichotomies.

=== Collidoscope de la Torre Brothers Retro-Perspective ===
The inaugural temporary exhibition at The Cheech, Collidoscope featured the work of the glass artists Einar and Jamex de la Torre, who were born in Guadalajara, Mexico, and currently live on both sides of the border in Southern California and Baja California. The exhibition was held at The Cheech from June 18, 2022 – January 22, 2023, before it traveled to other venues. Through a “collision of imagery, themes, and references,” says guest curator Selene Preciado, the two artists “unpack the tensions and contradictions of our postcolonial transcultural identity.”

Among the exhibited works were Colonial Atmosphere, 2002, a mixed media installation that addresses colonialism. It featured a lunar landing craft based on a monumental Olmec head and a saluting astronaut based on the Aztec goddess Coatlicue. The painted backdrop features Mexican vendors on the moon. The interior of the craft is manned by a European Christ child riding a stuffed rocking horse (the latter symbolizes the Apocalypse). The de la Torre brothers utilize many famous Mexican images, including the Virgin of Guadalupe and the Aztec Stone of the Sun (a.k.a. the Mexican Calendar Stone). Among the many works that employ the latter as a source is La Belle Epoch (the beautiful age), made in 2002. This kinetic mixed-media, blown-glass installation features a monumental version of the Stone of the Sun (120 x 144 x 36 inches) as a ferris wheel that spews faux blood into a glass canoe that is situated beneath it. Collidoscope also included ¡2020!, a glass sculpture that represents the COVID virus as a newborn child with protein spikes on it head.

=== Xican–a.o.x. Body ===
Held from June 17, 2023 – January 7, 2024, this exhibition was "the first major art exhibition to examine influential works that foreground the Brown body as a site to explore, expand, and complicate traditional conceptions linked to Mexican, Mexican-American, and Xicanx experiences." Co-curated by Cecilia Fajardo Hill, with Marissa Del Toro and Gilbert Vicario, the exhibition was organized by the American Federation of Arts. The time span covered by the exhibition stretched from the late 1960s through the present, featuring around 70 artists and artist collectives. It treated a wide range of materials, including film, pottery, Low Riders, and poetry, as well as painting, sculpture, and film.

=== Origenes/Origins ===
On view June 17 – October 1, 2023 at the Altura Credit Union Community Gallery at The Cheech, this exhibition explored how seven Chicana/o and Mexican American artists utilized their personal histories in Southern California as sources of inspiration for their art. Origenes/Origins was curated by Cosmé Cordova,

=== Indigenous Futurism ===
Indigenous Futurism, October 14, 2023 – February 18, 2024, was an exhibition of 18 Californian all-femme artists' sculptures, paintings, works on paper, and videos viewed through an indigenous lens. The artists hail from areas in California located by the four cardinal directions: to the east - Inland Empire, south - San Diego, west - Los Angeles, and north - San Francisco Bay Area. Denise Silva, a Riverside-based artist, curated the exhibition. The participating artists were Abby Aceves, Ariana Arroyo, Adriana Carranza, Melanie Cervantes, Amparo Chi, Rosy Cortez, Emilia Cruz, Stephanie Godoy, Mariana Gómez, Mariah Green, Jeshua, Belen Ledezma, Andrea Ramirez, Lilia Ramirez, Denise Silva, Maritza Torres, Sarah Vazquez and Mer Young. Silva recounted, "This exhibition explores how the artists incorporate their ancient tools in their respective practices for our collective liberation." The term "indigenous futurism," which is analogous to Afrofuturism, was coined by professor and author Grace Dillon, who is of Anishinaabe ancestry. Dillon explains that it explores "how personally one is affected by colonization, discarding the emotional and psychological baggage carried from its impact, and recovering ancestral traditions." The exhibition is situated within the Altura Credit Union Community Gallery at The Cheech.

=== Judithe Hernández | Beyond Myself, Somewhere, I Wait for My Arrival ===
The retrospective Judithe Hernández: Beyond Myself, Somewhere, I Wait for My Arrival, February 3 – August 4, 2024, showcased work from her more than 50 year artistic career. Recurring narratives in the exhibit were the redemption and empowerment of the women portrayed within Hernández's artwork, and the realities and mythologies of Mexican migrant women. Her work also examined the legacy of colonization and the U.S. Mexico border and its impact on women and children. The exhibition included more than 80 works from her Adam & Eve, Juarez, Mexico, and Colonization series.

In 1983 Hernández had a one-person exhibit at Cayman Gallery in New York City making her one of the first Chicana artists to have a solo exhibition outside the Western United States. She went on to have an international career. Hernández was included in the first exhibition of Chicano art in Europe, Les Démons des Anges, and was one of three women featured.

In 2019 Hernández's seven-story mural La Nueva Reina de Los Ángeles was installed at La Plaza Village, located one block north of El Pueblo de Los Ángeles Historical Monument District. The mural installation marked her return as an artistic presence to downtown Los Angeles after a more than 40 year absence.

== Selected artists ==
Over 70 artists are represented in the collection, including:

- Carlos Almaraz
- Charles Bojórquez
- Pablo Andres Cristi
- Einar and Jamex de la Torre
- Gaspar Enriquez
- Margaret Garcia
- CiCi Segura González
- Raul Guerrero
- Gronk
- Wayne Alaniz Healy
- Adán Hernández
- Judithe Hernández
- Leo Limón
- Gilbert "Magu" Luján
- César A. Martínez
- Sandy Rodriguez
- Frank Romero
- Ricardo Ruiz
- Eloy Torrez
- John M. Valadez
- Patssi Valdez
- Jaime "Germs" Zacarias
- Vincent Valdez

== Film ==
Released in 2019, Edward Tyndall directed a short documentary film featuring Cheech Marin titled The Cheech: An American Icon's Crusade for the Chicano Art Movement. The film covers Marin's lifelong advocacy for Chicano art, and his efforts to develop The Cheech Marin Center for Chicano Art & Culture (formerly called The Cheech Marin Center for Chicano Art, Culture and Industry). El Dusty, a Grammy-Nominated musician, wrote the original music score. The production company was Mobius Films.

== See also ==
- Archives of American Art
- Chicano
- Chicana art
- Category:Chicano art
