= Alice Nelson =

Alice Nelson may refer to:

- Alice Nelson (The Brady Bunch), the housekeeper in the TV series The Brady Bunch, played by Ann B. Davis
- Alice Dunbar Nelson (1875–1935), American poet, journalist, and political activist
- Alice Essington Nelson (1846–1921), British artist
