= Anders Stone =

Painter and Multimedia Artist

Anders Stone (born in 1964) is a painter and multimedia artist. Stone studied art at the Escuela Nacional de Pintura y Escultura in Mexico and at the Art Institute in the U.S. The academic atmosphere of the 1980s was not conducive to Stone's pursuit of using traditional materials and study of chiaroscuro. All manner of modernity, video, installation, etc. was the heralded direction for students at these institutions.

Stone apprenticed for Conceptualist Daniel Foster (currently director of the Riverside Art Museum California, U.S.A.). While an odd pairing at first blush, Foster's view of randomness and surface had a profound effect on Stone's later work.

Currently, Anders Stone is residing in Sweden on a small, 1890s ranch with his family. Political and artistic openness are said to be reasons for his choice of locale. His work seems to echo the dusty, vintage feeling of an era of long ago, or as some critics have observed, maybe an era that never has been or one that has yet to come. Appreciation and condemnation of his work appears to come in equal measure.

== Personal life ==
The artist has avoided modern conveniences in favor of handmade tools and accouterments out of respect for old-world craftsmanship and an unwillingness to sacrifice time-honored diligence for contemporary conveniences.
