= Vera Pagava =

Georgian artist

- Born: 27 February 1907; Tbilisi, Georgia
- Died: 25 March 1988 (aged 81); Ivry-sur-Seine, France
- Known for: painting
- Movement: Abstract art
- Website: ac-vp.com

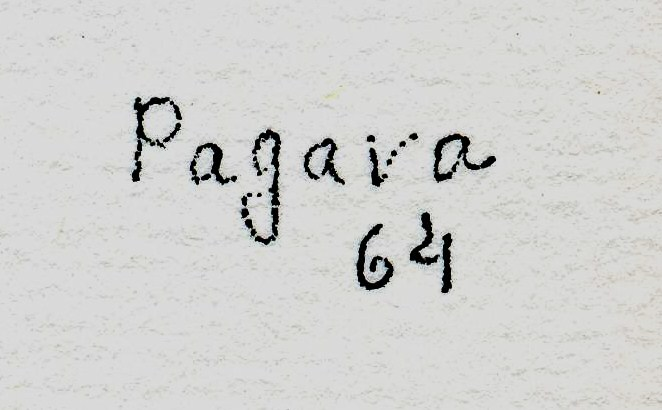
A signature of Vera Pagava.

Vera Pagava (Georgian: ვერა ფაღავა; 27 February 1907 – 25 March 1988) was a Georgian artist based in Paris.

== Early life ==
Vera Pagava was born in Tbilisi, Georgia. Her father was a lawyer; her mother was an educator. She moved to Berlin, Germany with her family in 1920, just months before Georgia became part of the Soviet Union. In 1923, they join the Georgian community in exile in France and settle in Montrouge. Vera Pagava studied decorative arts and painting first at the Arts et Publicité School, at the Ecole Nationale Supérieure des Arts Décoratifs, then at André Lhote Studio. From 1932 to 1939, she studied under Roger Bissière in the Academie Ranson.

== Career ==
In 1938 and 1939 Pagava participated to the Témoignage group show, initiated by Marcel Michaud. She presented painted fabrics. In 1943, Pagava met the famous gallery owner Jeanne Bucher, who exhibited her paintings alongside Dora Maar's in 1944. Several exhibitions at the Jeanne Bucher gallery will follow, in 1947, 1951, 1954 and 1960.

In the 1950s Pagava's works are largely presented abroad, in Pittsburgh in 1952 (Pittsburgh International Exhibition of Contemporary Art.), in Brussels in 1953, Norway in 1954 (Oslo, Bergen Trondheim, with Janice Biala and Maria Helena Vieira da Silva), Wuppertal in 1955, Berlin in 1956, Lausanne in 1957, New York City at the Meltzer Gallery in 1959.

She created a monumental mural work for the Vatican City pavilion at the Brussels World's Fair in 1958.

In 1966 she represented France at the 33rd Venice Biennale. A room was dedicated to her watercolors.

In 1982 and 1983 a retrospective exhibition is organized in different french museums : Musée des Beaux-Arts de Dijon (Donation Granville), Musée de Beauvais, Musée Saint-Denis de Reims and Musée des beaux-arts de Troyes.

The first retrospective of her work in Georgia was held in 2012 at the Dmitri Schevardnadze National Gallery.

Her work moved from figurative to abstract between the 1930s and the 1960s; she often used geometric forms and warm pale tones and greys in her work. "Vera Pagava susurre, ou presque" (Vera Pagava whispers, or almost), commented a critic in 2016. Another critic described her later work as "highly singular, combining formal purity with luminous intimacy."

Pagava's work was included in the 2021 exhibition Women in Abstraction at the Centre Pompidou. In 2022, Pagava's work was included in The Guggenheim Museum Bilbao's exhibit: "From Fauvism to Surrealism: Masterpieces from the Musée d’Art Moderne (MAM) de Paris." In 2023 the TBC Concept gallery in Tbilisi held a solo exhibition of Pagava' work entitled Silent Cities.

Pagava's works are in the collections of the Musée National d’Art Moderne (MNAM) Centre Georges Pompidou, Paris, France, the Musée des Beaux-arts de Dijon (Donation Pierre Granville), Dijon, France, and the Unterlinden Museum, Colmar, France

== Personal life and legacy ==
In 1979 Pagava's life-time companion, artist "Vano" Ivane Enoukidze, died.

Pagava died in 1988 at Ivry-sur-Seine, aged 81 years. She is buried in Leuville-sur-Orge Cemetery. The "Association culturelle Vera Pagava" was founded in Paris in 1991 to promote and preserve Vera Pagava's work and archives. Her work is part of various private and public collections such as the Pompidou Centre.
