= Joan Robledo-Palop =

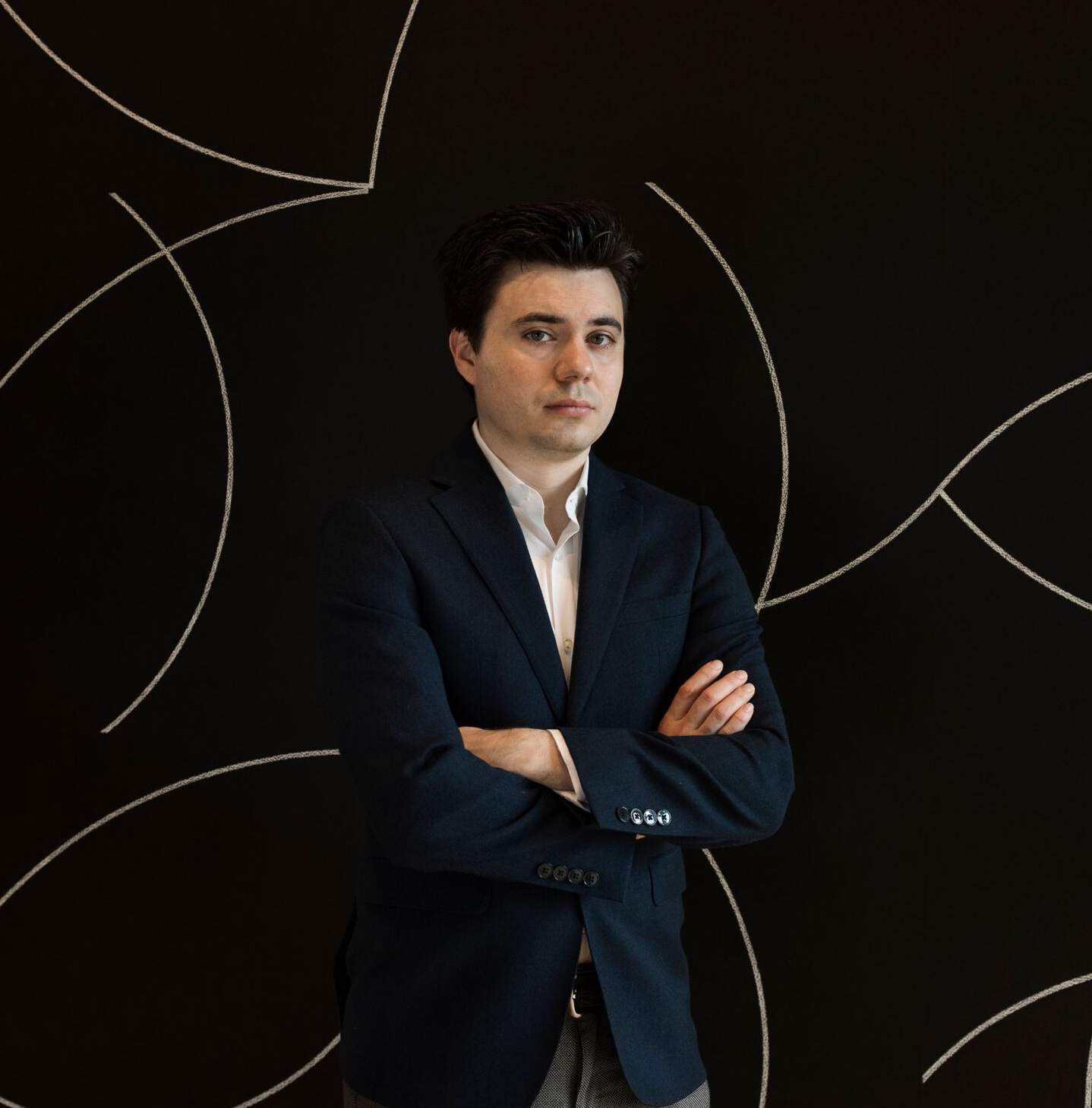
- Born: Carcaixent, Valencia, Spain
- Education: Universitat de València, Universidad Autónoma de Madrid, Yale University
- Occupation: Art Historian
- Known for: Pintura, expresionismo y kitsch. La generacion del entusiasmo

Joan Robledo-Palop is an art historian, entrepreneur and art collector born in Valencia, Spain, and based in New York, USA.

Robledo-Palop studied History of Art at the Universitat de València, Universidad Autonoma de Madrid and at Yale University, where he wrote his MA thesis on the art of Francisco de Goya. He has been a Research Fellow at the Spanish National Research Council - CSIC in Madrid, and at New York University.

He was a curator at the Fundación Chirivella Soriano and has worked for curatorial departments at the Yale University Art Gallery and the Yale Center for British Art. He has published, taught and lectured widely on Modern and Contemporary Art in institutions such as Yale, the School of Visual Arts in New York, University College Cork, Ireland, the Hermitage Museum in St. Petersburg, Russia, Centre Pompidou Málaga, and the Museo Reina Sofia in Madrid.

In 2016, Joan Robledo-Palop founded Zeit Contemporary Art, a New York-based firm specializing in modern, postwar and contemporary art. He has shown the work of Eddie Aparicio, Julia Rooney, Bryson Rand, Vincent Tiley and Zoe Walsh.

== Selected works ==
- Minimal Means: Concrete Inventions in the US, Brazil and Spain (2019)
- El cuerpo y la sombra: una cartografia de lo monstruoso en la cultura moderna (2013)
- La desaparicion de la imagen: Conversacion con Elena Asins (2011)
- Pintura, expressionismo y kitsch. La generacion del entusiasmo (2010)
- Blanco/Negro: Sujeto, Espacio, Percepcion (2009)
