= Tania Mouraud =

French artist

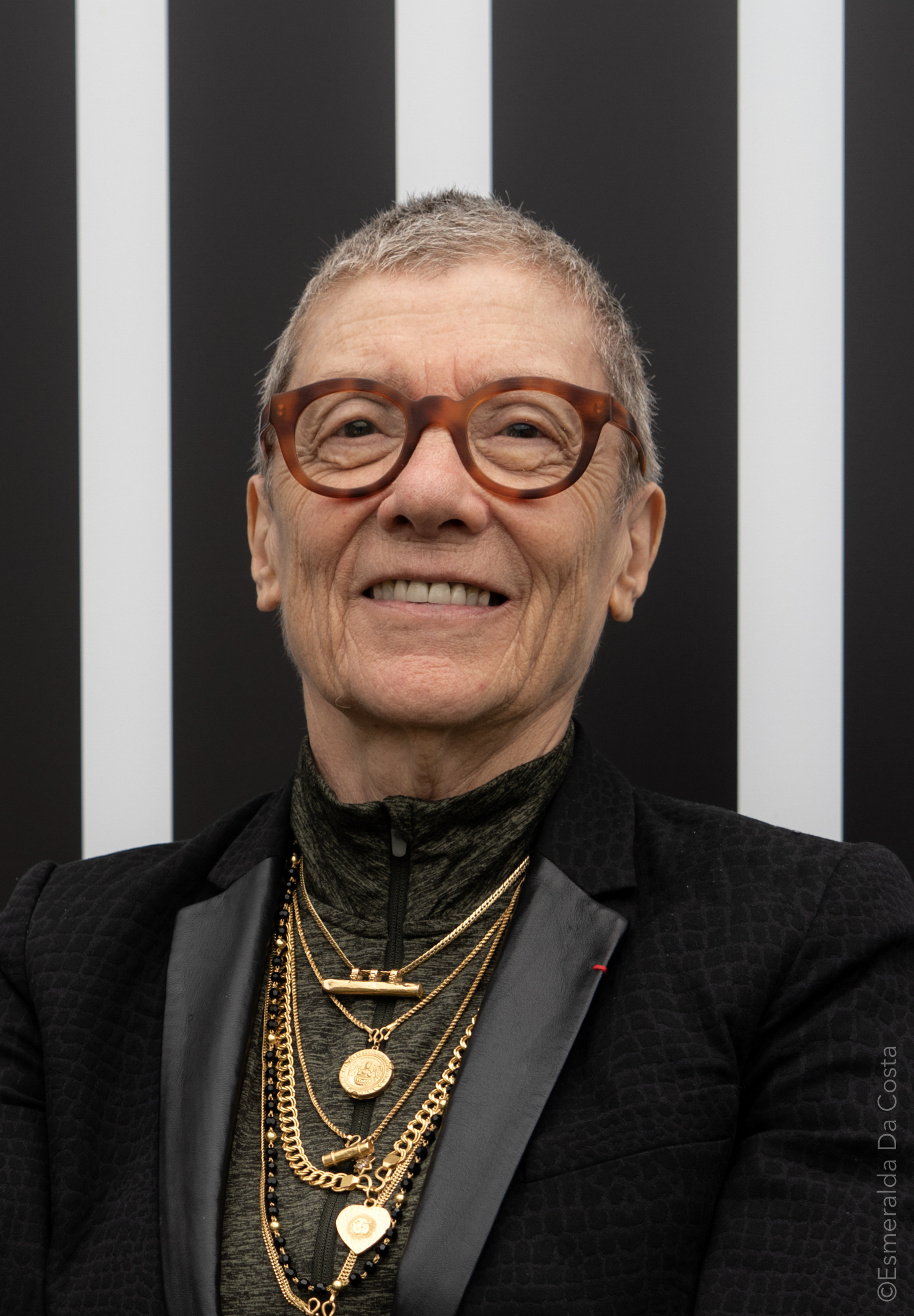
- Born: 1942; Paris, France
- Education: Autodidact
- Known for: Video, photography, installation and sound performances
- Awards: chevalier de la Légion d'honneur, chevalier de l'ordre national du Mérite, officier des Arts et des Lettres, officier de l'ordre national du Mérite
- Website: taniamouraud.com

Tania Mouraud (born Paris 1942) is a contemporary French video artist and photographer. She holds Seat 8 in Painting of the French Académie des Beaux-Arts.

Tania Mouraud began her artistic career at a young age as a painter. Later on, she shifted towards photography, continuously growing her portfolio. In the late 1990s, she created her first videos. Her work heavily features themes of anguish and responsibility, drawing from her personal mourning.

Mouraud's interest in videography eventually led to her to express her work through audial performances. She founded Unité de Production in 2002 for her sound performances, but embarked on live solo performances only after a few concerts with the group. She produced various video installations, including Ad Infinitum (2008), Ad Nauseam (2014), and a collaboration with the Institut de Recherche et Coordination Acoustique/Musique (IRCAM).

In 2015, the exhibition: "Tania Mouraud. A Retrospective." was shown at the Centre Pompidou-Metz. Mouraud's work was included in the 2021 exhibition Women in Abstraction at the Centre Pompidou. Tania Mouraud was elected to the Académie des Beaux-Arts on March 27, 2024.

== Early life ==
Tania Mouraud was born in Paris in 1942. She is the daughter of Martine Mouraud, journalist, publicist turned businesswoman, and writer. Her Romanian-born father, Marcel Mouraud, was a lawyer and collector of modern art. Both her parents were a part of the French Resistance.

She was exposed to art at an early age from her family's travels. She moved to England and then to Germany, where she discovered avant-garde art. Mouraud was influenced by various artists, including Zero, Beuys, John Cage, Gregory Corso, and John Coltrane, additionally befriending artists Gotthard Graubner and Reiner Ruthenbeck.

In the late 1960s, she lived in New York, where she met artist Dennis Oppenheim, bringing her into contact with the New York art scene.

Her first exhibition took place in 1966 at the Zunini gallery in Paris where she exhibited her peintures médicales (French for "medical paintings"), a notably intentionally unemotive collection of human drawings. She commented:

"If my painting is intentionally schematic it is because I want to escape the pathos in the search of precision. I like that which is clear. Feelings are dangerous; the object is defined, reassuring. If one day I decide to paint the human figure, it will be as an object."

In 1968, Tania Mouraud publicly burned all of her previous paintings.

== Later work ==
=== The Work of Art as an analytical proposition ===
In 1975, Tania Mouraud created in situ installations called "Art Spaces" in which short phrases, written on plastic construction sheeting the size of the wall, question the conditions of visual perception and lead the viewer to a vertiginous awareness from where he can see the depth of what he is doing.

Tania Mouraud continued this theme when she founded the group TRANS with Thierry Kuntzel then with Jon Gibson throughout the installations. Tania Mouraud then exhibited at PS1 in New York where she met Dara Birnbaum and Dan Graham. That same year she began teaching at the Regional School of plastic expression in Tourcoing France.

During this period, she began her famous Wall Paintings which were huge black painted letters that were stretched, straight, and very close together to the point of almost being illegible. They form a word or sometimes a phrase, such as "I Have a Dream". In 1989, "WYSIWYG" (What you see is what you get) was exhibited at the BPI of the Centre Georges-Pompidou where "the first of the Wall Paintings of Tania Mouraud concealed the slogan of a well-known brand of computer beneath its lofty appearance".

While she displayed her Wall Paintings series within the art school where she teaches, Tania Mouraud transmitted her vision of the responsibility of the artist facing history: "With this exhibition, I hear students ask the same question I ask myself: what does it mean to be an artist in '92? In 1992, when there are three million people unemployed in a manner seemingly excluding them from society, and that we see the reappearance of the specter of racism? Then there was the phrase, "I have a dream" written in strongly elongated and somewhat illegible lettering, but there will always be someone to decipher them. I speak for that person. It's a secret. "

=== Videos and Installations ===
For the artist, the practice of "the sequential image" has long been set aside but it was during the 1990s that Tania Mouraud gradually became interested in video. "I have become accustomed to walking with a camcorder and, little by little, the idea has emerged." It was the 2000s that marked a turning point for the artist where video became an important part of her work.

Among the main creations:

- "Sightseeing" 2002. A foggy winter landscape, shot through a misty window, unfolds before our eyes, escorted by the incisive air of a klezmer clarinet. For seven minutes the road is an anguished climb to a stop, where finally, in front, a path firmly leads our gaze to a place where we will not approach. We then see that it is the concentration camp Natzweiler-Struthof, in Alsace. "The memory then falsely induces us to the illusion of a train journey, while signs of a car trip are present in the image. "
- "La Curée", 2003. Hunting dogs slowly and sensually devour raw meat. "This film is an ode to life. It is an image of violence, but in reality, when you look, it is the skin, the hair, it is a choreography of the body ... The dogs are happy because this is their reward. They do not seem mean. This is perhaps the violence of eroticism ... "
- "Le verger", 2003. Images of flowers in vibrant colors alternate with images of war at a pace difficult to follow and in a heavy and metallic air, punctuated by harrowing cries. Le Verger was immediately exhibited at the Fonds régional d'art contemporain (Frac) in Lower Normandy.
- "La Fabrique", 2006. Video installations, filmed in India, which will be exhibited in several cities in France including the Foire Internationale d'Art Contemporain (Fiac) curated by the Dominique Fiat gallery, and also in California, Canada and finally in St. Petersburg. "The faces of 108 male and female workers on multiple monitors and the deafening sound of working looms create in the visitor a sensation of mechanical work. The dislocated bodies of these workers are the engine of this strange fabric ..."
- "Roaming", 2009. Video installation on display at the musée de la chasse et de la nature in Paris.

=== Sound and Sound Performances ===
In 2002, Tania Mouraud founded the musical experimentation group " Unité de Production".

=== Writings on Tania Mouraud ===
Monographs

- 2022, [Dire], catalogue, LABF15, Lyon, Perrine Lacroix, Cécile Renoult
- 2019, Tania Mouraud, Ecriture(s), catalogue, Le Hangar 107, Rouen, Nicolas Couturieux, Mathias Barthel, Cécile Renoult
- 2018, Tania Mouraud, Everything must have an ending except my love for you, catalogue, Tauves, Perrine Le Querrec
- 2017, Tania Mouraud, Who's the enemy ?, catalogue, La Mouche, lieu d’art contemporain, Béziers, France.
- 2016, OTNOT, Eastwards Prospectus, text by Elodie Stroecken, Bucharest, Romania
- 2016, TANIA MOURAUD, Eastwards Prospectus
- 2016, Everyday ogres at Visual Arts Centre - The University of Texas at Austin, USA
- 2015, Tania Mouraud, Une Rétrospective, catalogue, Centre Pompidou-Metz
- 2014, Tania Mouraud, Ad Nauseam, catalogue, Mac/Val
- 2014, Tania Mouraud, exhausted laughters, catalogue, musée d'art moderne et contemporain de Saint-Étienne
- 2004, Tania Mouraud, textes de Arnauld Pierre, Éditions Flammarion
