= Marta Hoepffner =

German artist and photographer

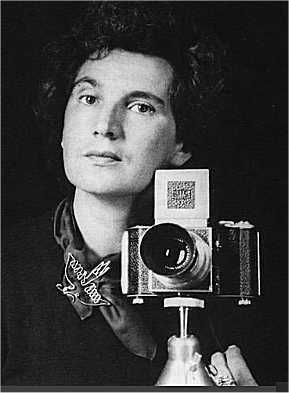
- Born: 4 January 1912; Pirmasens, Germany
- Died: 3 April 2000 (aged 88); Lindenberg im Allgäu, Germany
- Known for: Photography

Marta Hoepffner (1912–2000) was a German artist and photographer. She is known for her abstract and experimental photography.

Hoepffner was born on 4 January 1912 in Pirmasens.

She studied at the Städelschule under Willi Baumeister and participated at the New Frankfurt-project. She graduated in 1933. Remaining in Germany during World War II, Hoepffner worked as an illustrator for the magazine Das Illustrierte Blatt.

After the war Hoepffner began creating color photograms. Hoepffner taught at a photography school in Hofheim am Taunus along with her partner and fellow photographer, Irm Schoeffers, and her sister sister, Madeleine Hoepffner.

Hoepffner died on 3 April 2000 in Lindenberg im Allgäu.

Her work is in the collection of the Metropolitan Museum of Art, the National Gallery of Art, and the Städel Museum.

Hoepffner's work was included in the 2021 exhibition Women in Abstraction at the Centre Pompidou.
