= Harry Geffert =

American sculptor

- Born: 1934; Live Oak County, Texas, U.S.
- Died: November 10, 2017 (aged 82–83); Crowley, Texas, U.S.
- Education: Texas State University; New Mexico Highlands University
- Occupation: Sculptor

Harry Geffert (1934 – November 10, 2017) was an American bronze sculptor.

== Life ==
Geffert was born in 1934, in Live Oak County, Texas. He graduated with a bachelor of science degree from Southwest Texas State University (later known as Texas State University), and he earned a master's degree from New Mexico Highlands University.

Geffert was a professor of Sculpture at Texas Christian University for nearly three decades. In the 1980s, he opened a studio in Crowley, Texas, where he made bronze sculptures. He exhibited his sculptures at the Dallas Museum of Art in 1990-1991.

Geffert died on November 10, 2017, in Crowley, Texas. His artwork can be seen at the Dallas Museum of Art, the Museum of Fine Arts, Houston, the Modern Art Museum of Fort Worth, and the El Paso Museum of Art.
