= Women in Abstraction =

Abstract art exhibition, 2021

Women in Abstraction. Another History of Abstraction in the 20th Century or Elles font l'abstraction. Une autre histoire de l'abstraction au XXe siècle was a major exhibition of 20th-century Abstract art created by women artists. The exhibition presented more than five hundred works across a wide range of artistic media from over one hundred international women artists. Spanning various periods of Modern art from the mid-19th to the 20th century, it was first exhibited in 2021 at the Centre Georges Pompidou in Paris 2021, and later travelled to the Guggenheim Museum in Bilbao and the West Bund Museum in Shanghai.

== Description ==
Curated by Christine Macel at the Centre Pompidou, the exhibition brought together more than five hundred works across a wide range of artistic media from over one hundred internantional women artists. This included painting, film, sculpture, photography, and installation, arranged chronologically from the 19th century to the 1980s.

The show was initiated as many exhibitions on abstraction have tended to marginalize or underrepresent the contributions of women to the evolution of modern abstract art. The aim of the exhibition was to present the significant impact of numerous women artists on the development of abstraction in Modern art. Documenting this, an accompanying catalogue was published and an international symposium Women in Abstraction was held at the Centre Pompidou.

The exhibition was next shown at the Guggenheim Museum in Bilbao, Spain, from 2 October 2021 to 27 February 2022. Following this, the show travelled to the West Bund Museum in Shanghai, China, where it was presented in a reduced scope from 11 February 2022 to 03 August 2023. The Shanghai exhibition consisted of nearly 100 works from the late 19th to the early 21st century, created by thirty-four women artists.

== Artists ==
The following artists were included in the show:

- Magdalena Abakanowicz
- Berenice Abbott
- Carla Accardi
- Etel Adnan
- Anni Albers
- Laure Albin-Guillot
- Gertrud Arndt
- Ruth Asawa
- Elena Asins
- Vanessa Bell
- Lynda Benglis
- Martha Boto
- Louise Bourgeois
- Trisha Brown
- Jagoda Buić
- Mary Ellen Bute
- Marcelle Cahn
- Huguette Caland
- Regina Cassolo
- Rosemarie Castoro
- Giannina Censi
- Judy Chicago
- Lucinda Childs
- Wook-kyung Choi
- Irene Chou
- Lygia Clark
- Carlotta Corpron
- Parvine Curie
- Dadamaino
- Elaine de Kooning
- Sonia Delaunay-Terk
- Germaine Dulac
- Alice Essington Nelson
- Alexandra Exter
- Claire Falkenstein
- Monir Shahroudy Farmanfarmaian
- Esther Ferrer
- Helen Frankenthaler
- Olga Fröbe-Kapteyn
- Loïe Fuller
- Gego
- Nathalie Gontcharova
- Marcia Hafif
- Harmony Hammond
- Mary Heilmann
- Florence Henri
- Barbara Hepworth
- Carmen Herrera
- Eva Hesse
- Sheila Hicks
- Marta Hoepffner
- Georgiana Houghton
- Lotte Jacobi
- Shirley Jaffe
- Virginia Jaramillo
- Tess Jaray
- Barbara Kasten
- Ilona Keserü
- Helen Khal
- Hilma af Klint
- Emily Kame Kngwarreye
- Benita Koch-Otte
- Běla Kolářová
- Katarzyna Kobro
- Lee Krasner
- Germaine Krull
- Ida Lansky
- Bice Lazzari
- Verena Loewensberg
- Barbara Maples
- Agnes Martin
- Dora Maurer
- Marie Menken
- Joan Mitchell
- Nasreen Mohamedi
- Marlow Moss
- Tania Mouraud
- Aurelia Munoz
- Elizabeth Murray
- Aurelie Nemours
- Louise Nevelson
- Véra Pagava
- Gret Palucca
- Marta Pan
- Lygia Pape
- Alicia Penalba
- Howardena Pindell
- Lioubov Popova
- Saloua Raouda Choucair
- Judit Reigl
- Bridget Riley
- Dorothea Rockburne
- Olga Rozanova
- Valentine de Saint-Point
- Zilia Sánchez
- Helen Saunders
- Lillian Schwartz
- Arpita Singh
- Janet Sobel
- Varvara Stepanova
- Hedda Sterne
- Jessica Stockholder
- Gunta Stölzl
- Sophie Taeuber-Arp
- Atsuko Tanaka
- Lenore Tawney
- Elsa Thiemann
- Maria Helena Vieira da Silva
- Alma Woodsey Thomas
- Fahrelnissa Zeid
