= Ida Lansky =

Canadian-born American photographer

Ida G. Lansky
- Born: Ida G. Leranbaum; 1910; Toronto, Ontario
- Died: November 27, 1997; Dallas, Texas
- Resting place: Toronto, Canada
- Education: Texas Woman's University
- Known for: Photography
- Style: Bauhaus
- Spouse: Irving Lansky (1945-1970)

Ida G. Lansky (née Leranbaum 1910 – November 27, 1997) was a Canadian-born American photographer. She was most active between 1954 and 1960, when she stopped publicly exhibiting her work and chose to study library science. Lansky is known as an important pioneer of Modernist photography in Texas, known as Texas Bauhaus.

== Biography ==
Lansky was born in Toronto, Ontario in 1910. She received a BS in public health nursing from New York University in 1942. Her photography career took place roughly at the same time she studied visual art at Texas Woman's University from 1954 to 1959.

A major influence on Lansky was photographer, Carlotta Corpron, who worked in the Bauhaus style and who taught at Texas Woman's University. Lansky was one of her students and was introduced to the avant-garde, Bauhaus ideal by Corpron.

Lansky's earlier photographs were considered "regular," though they show an "interest in reflection, distortion and abstraction." Lansky was invited by Henry Holmes Smith to participate in a group exhibition, Photographer's Choice, at Indiana University. Photographer's Choice included works by Ansel Adams, Nathan Lyons and other well-known photographers.

Lansky was considered one of only a few artists in the mid-twentieth century who saw photography as a method for creating unique imagery rather than a method of representation. She was also an expert in the chemistry of photography, filling up notebooks with detailed records of her experiments. Lansky experimented with different light exposures, chemicals and temperatures, seeing how these variables affected the final prints. Her "experiments" were also considered artistic: with galleries in Dallas, Texas and San Francisco inviting her to show her work.

In 1960, she exhibited at The Black Tulip Galleries in Dallas, which would be her last show. Lansky chose to pursue a career in library science instead of art. She attended Texas Woman's University again to receive her master's degree in Library Science in 1967. For almost twenty years, she worked at the University of Texas at Arlington as a cataloging librarian.

She died in Dallas, Texas in 1997.

== Legacy ==
In 2006, the El Paso Museum of Art held a traveling exhibition of Lansky's work, along with her professor, Corpron and another photographer in the Texas Bauhaus style, Barbara Maples. In 2015, Lansky's photographic innovations were featured in an exhibition titled Experimental Photography, held at Photographs Do Not Bend (PDNB) Gallery. Lansky's estate is represented by the PDNB Gallery in Dallas. Her work is also in the collections of the El Paso Museum of Art and the Amon Carter Museum of American Art.

Lansky's work was included in the 2021 exhibition Women in Abstraction at the Centre Pompidou.
