= Aurèlia Muñoz =

Spanish textile artist

- Born: 13 April 1926; Barcelona, Spain
- Died: 9 June 2011 (aged 84–85); Barcelona, Spain
- Other name: Aurèlia Muñoz Ventura
- Known for: Fiber art
- Website: aureliamunoz.cat

Aurèlia Muñoz (1926–2011) was a Spanish textile artist. She is known for her tapestries and fiber sculptures.

Muñoz was born on April 13, 1926 in Barcelona. She attended the Escola Massana, Centre d'Art i Disseny. She was part of the new era of textile art in the 1960s and 1970s.

In 1993 Muñoz received the Creu de Sant Jordi for her craftsmanship and her part in the renewal of textile art in Catalonia. She was a member of the World Crafts Council.

Muñoz died in Barcelona on 9 June 2011.

From 2019 through 2021 the Museu Nacional d'Art de Catalunya highlighted her work in an exhibition entitled Knotting the Space. Her work was included in the 2021 exhibition Women in Abstraction at the Centre Pompidou.

== Collections ==
Muñoz' work is in the permanent collections of the Fondation Toms Pauli, the Museo Nacional Centro de Arte Reina Sofía, the Museu d'Art Contemporani de Barcelona, the Museu Nacional d'Art de Catalunya, and the Museum of Modern Art, New York.
