= Regina Cassolo Bracchi =

Italian sculptor (1894–1974)

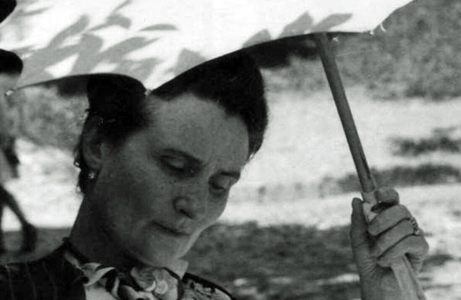
- Born: Regina Prassede Cassolo; 21 May 1894; Mede, Italy
- Died: 14 September 1974 (aged 80); Milan, Italy
- Movement: Movimento Arte Concreta

Regina Cassolo Bracchi (1894–1974) was an Italian sculptor. She is known for her pioneering use of materials such as aluminum, wire, and tin. She was part of the Futurist movement as well as the Movimento arte concreta and Spatialism.

== Life ==
Bracchi née Cassolo was born in Mede on 21 May 1894. She studied at the Brera Academy in Milan and then at the studio of Giovanni Battista Alloati (1878 - 1964) in Turin, Italy. In 1934 she signed the Manifesto Tecnico dell'Aeroplastica Futurista (Technical Manifesto of Futurist Aeroplastics). In 1948 she joined the Movimento Arte Concreta.

Cassolo died in Milan on 14 September 1974.

In 2021 the Galleria d'Arte Moderna e Contemporanea (GAMeC, Gallery of Modern and Contemporary Art) held a retrospective of her work. The same year her work was in the exhibition Women in Abstraction at the Centre Pompidou.
