= Emilia Cruz =

Mexican-American artist

- Born: 1993 (age 31–32); San Diego, California, United States
- Education: ArtCenter College of Design
- Known for: oil and acrylic paintings depicting women of color

Emilia Cruz (born 1993) is a Mexican-American artist known for her oil and acrylic paintings depicting women of color in nature.

== Biography ==
Emilia Cruz was born in 1993 in San Diego, California and raised in Simi Valley. She currently resides in Ventura County, California. As a child, she traveled back and forth to Tijuana, Mexico to visit family. Emilia attended Atherwood Elementary School and Royal High School. She is pursuing a BA in Illustration at the ArtCenter College of Design in Pasadena, California. While studying, she teaches classes to young artists between the ages 3–12 at Plaza de La Raza located in Lincoln Heights, Los Angeles, CA.

== Notable art ==
One of her best-known paintings is titled Am I too dark?.

=== SPARC, Venice, CA, When She Rises (2018) ===
Emilia Cruz’s artwork was featured in the When She Rises exhibition at SPARC in Venice, Los Angeles in 2018. The theme of the exhibition revolves around social justice and ecology, and its relation to the artist and their community.

=== Netflix Series Gente-fied (2019) ===
Emilia Cruz’s artwork was commissioned to be a part of the Netflix series 'Gente-fied' in 2019. Cruz’s artwork were the paintings that Ana Morales, the main character, paints in the series. Her main role was to create paintings of fictional characters.

=== CNN en Español, Proyecto Ser Humano (2019) ===
In 2019, Emilia Cruz was commissioned by CNN en Español to create a painting for Proyecto ser Humano. Her painting was expected to demonstrate diversity, inclusion, and solidarity.
