= Fundacion Chirivella Soriano =

The Fundacion Chirivella Soriano is a private foundation in Valencia, Spain, devoted to the study, exhibition, interpretation and preservation of modern and contemporary art. The Foundation is located in the Palau Joan de Valeriola, a 14th-century gothic building in the historic center of the city of Valencia. The Foundation has one of the most prominent art collections in Spain.

== Collection ==
The collection was established by Alicia Soriano and Manuel Chirivella and is one of the most comprehensive collections of Spanish art. It includes majors works by artists such as Antonio Saura, Manolo Millares, Equipo 57, Equipo Cronica, Elena Asins, Jose Maria Yturralde, Jose Maria Sicilia and Dario Villalba among others. Since 2005, the collection has been presented in several thematic exhibitions, including shows devoted to geometric abstraction, the use of black and white colors in art, art and politics during the Spanish Transition to democracy, and color and poetry among other presentations.

== Programs ==
The Foundation programs three exhibitions a year focused both on interpretations of the collection and on contemporary and emerging artists. Since 2015, the Foundation hosts the World Press Photo in Valencia, the most prestigious exhibition devoted to photojournalism.

== Palau Joan de Valeriola ==
The Palau Joan de Valeriola is one of the finest examples of the civil gothic architecture in the Mediterranean. The building was the residence of Joan de Valeriola, descendant of Arnau Valleriola, the most important financier in 14th century Valencia. The last member of the family that occupied the palace was Gaspar, who joined the Borja family after marrying Anna de Borja, niece of Pope Alexander VI. Its patrimonial and architectural value is based on its interior spaces, its unique Gothic elements (arches, windows, chairs) and the uniqueness of its wooden ceilings covered with great decorative details that were rediscovered during the rehabilitation of the building.
