= Alice Essington Nelson =

British artist and spirtualist (1846–1921)

- Born: 1846; Cheltenham, England
- Died: 1921 (aged 74–75); Hove, England
- Known for: Abstract painting
- Movement: Abstract
- Spouse: William Essington Nelson

Alice Essington Nelson (1846–1921) was a British artist whose later work reflected her interest in spiritualism.

== Early life ==
Essington Nelson was born in 1846 in Cheltenham in the English county of Gloucestershire. Developing an interest in landscape painting, she joined the Society of Female Artists, later the Society of Women Artists, which was normal for those women who had studied fine arts. At this time, she was a relatively unknown artist.

== Spiritualism ==
In 1889 she became a member of the Society for Psychical Research, which had been founded seven years earlier. She then joined the London Spiritualist Alliance, whose members would include Alfred Russel Wallace and Arthur Conan Doyle. The reasons why she joined these two bodies are unclear. Both gave women a status equal to that of men, but an alternative explanation is that her baby son had died and that her husband, William Essington Nelson, died shortly after she gave birth to a girl, so she may have been seeking solace in spiritualism. Her husband was a music teacher who taught at the Fulneck Moravian Settlement near Leeds. It is probable that she found in abstract art a means of expressing her belief in the beyond.

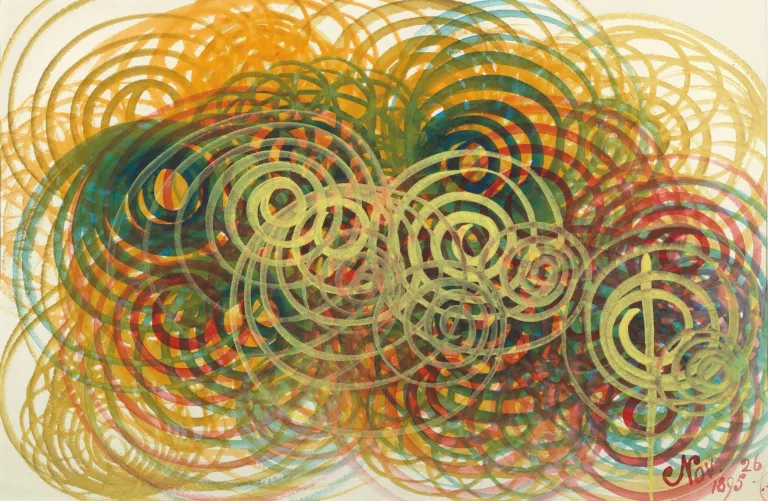
Shewing the Influence of Osiris

== Artistic works ==
Only one piece of work by Essington Nelson is known to have survived, but that has been recently exhibited. Inspired by the artist and spiritualist, Georgiana Houghton, and others, she used geometric shapes and colours to convey a spiritual meaning. The work, Shewing the Influence of Osiris, involves the use of spirals, the spiral being a sacred symbol often associated with cosmic evolution. Osiris was the Egyptian god of the afterlife. Essington Nelson said that the process of producing the work was guided by her parapsychic powers. According to the Guggenheim Museum Bilbao, although she was ignored by artistic circles for many decades, it is now time to give her a deserved place in the history of art.

== World War One ==
During World War I, Essington Nelson helped to run Lady Gifford's home for nurses in Boulogne, France. This was for the convalescence of nurses near the front line who often experienced considerable trauma as a result of treating soldiers with severe injuries.

== Exhibitions ==
Shewing the Influence of Osiris was exhibited at Elles font l'abstraction. Une autre histoire de l'abstraction au XXe siècle, which was an exhibition of 20th-century abstract art created by women artists, first shown in 2021 at the Centre Georges Pompidou in Paris, and later at the Guggenheim Museum in Bilbao, Spain. Her work also featured in The Medium is the Message, an exhibition organised by the College of Psychic Studies at the end of 2025.

== Death ==
Essington-Nelson died in Hove, East Sussex in England in 1921. Shewing the Influence of Osiris is held by the College of Psychic Studies in London.
