= Ilona Keserü Ilona =

Hungarian artist (born 1933)

Ilona Keserü
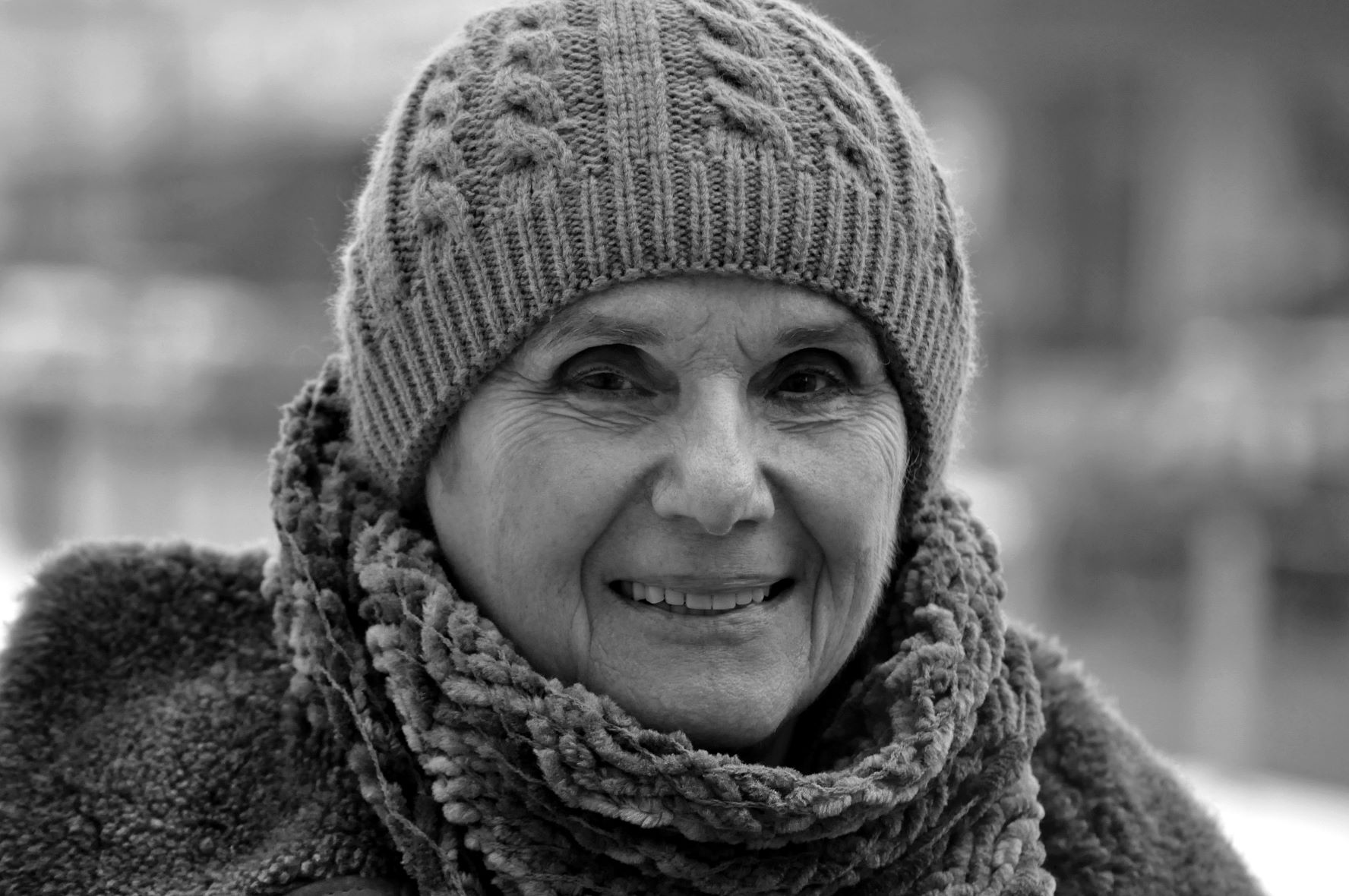
- Ilona Keserü (2010)
- Born: 29 November 1933 (age 92); Pécs
- Education: Ferenc Martyn
- Alma mater: Academy of Fine Art
- Awards: Kossuth Prize
- Website: www.ikeseru.org

Ilona Keserü (born Pécs, Hungary, 29 November 1933) is a Hungarian painter, professor emerita, Kossuth Prize winner.

== Life and career ==
Ilona Keserü was born in Pécs, Hungary. She studied at the Free School of Art (Pécs) between 1946 and 1950, then at the High School of Fine and Applied Art (Budapest) between 1950 and 1952. She was accepted to the Academy of Fine Art in 1952, where, after completing the painting and mural courses, she graduated in 1958. During the first three years at the college her professor had been László Bencze, followed by István Szőnyi. However, she considers Ferenc Martyn as her real master, who had been overseeing her professional development from as early as 1945.

Keserü was a member of the Iparterv Group and the Atelier Budapest.

From 1960 she worked for the Belles-lettres and the Ferenc Móra Publishing Houses as an illustrator. In 1962 she received a scholarship from the Italian government and followed the courses of the Accademia di Belle Arti di Roma for a year. There she had her first show at the Galleria Bars in 1963. She then returned to Hungary and besides painting, she dedicated herself to designing sets and costumes for performances at the National Theatre, the Katona József Theatre, the Opera House, and the Ódry Stage in Budapest, the Gergely Csíky Theatre in Kaposvár, the Katona József Theatre in Kecskemét and the Hungarian Theatre in Targu Mures (Romania).

Ilona Keserü showed her first abstract paintings at the Jókai Klub in Budapest in 1964, then regularly thereafter in Budapest and various Hungarian cities. In 1972 she exhibited in Czechoslovakia, then, in the summer of 1974 she painted a mural in Vence (France). She also worked on a mural for the new Sports Palace in Budapest in 1979. From 1963 onwards she has taken part in numerous group-shows throughout the world. For example, at the Olympiade des Arts in Seoul, South Korea in 1988, at the Das Offene Bild in Münster, Germany in 1992.

Ilona Keserü taught drawing and painting at the University of Pécs from 1983 to 2003 (from 1991 as professor). From 2003 to 2008, as professor emerita, she organized short painting courses and exhibitions for Doctorate students entitled Színerő (Colour Force), a platform for creating and presenting works of large scale at the unused great halls of the Zsolnay Factory in Pécs. She is one of the founders of the Master School of Fine Arts in Pécs. She also gave lectures at universities abroad as a guest professor: at the École des Beaux Arts (Cergy-Pontoise, France) in 1985, and at the University of Hertfordshire (UK) in 1998. Throughout her life, Keserü took part in study trips to various countries from Poland to the US.

Ilona Keserü received the Mihály Munkácsy Prize in 1984, became an Artist of Merit in 1989, and was awarded the Cross Order of Merit of the Hungarian Republic in 1996. She became a member of the Széchenyi Academy of Letters and Arts in 1993. In 2000 she was awarded the Kossuth Prize and in 2014 the Artist of the Nation Award.

Ilona Keserü lives and works in Budapest and Pécs, Hungary.

== Legacy and collections ==
Her work was included in the 2021 exhibition Women in Abstraction at the Centre Pompidou. In 2023 the Hungarian National Gallery held a retrospective exhibition entitled Ilona Keserü 90. Self-Powered Pictures. A Selection from the Graphic Oeuvre.

Her work is in the Hungarian National Gallery, the Ludwig Museum - Museum of Contemporary Art, the Metropolitan Museum of Art and the MNB Arts and Culture collection.
