= Ricardo Ruiz (artist) =

American artist

Ricardo Ruiz is a Chicano artist based in Corpus Christi, Texas whose paintings depict scenes infused with Mexican folklore and personal memoir. The URL for his professional website is "ricardoruiz.art".

== Biography ==
Ricardo Ruiz (also known as Ricardo Ruiz the Elder) was born in Corpus Christi, Texas, where he still resides. Ruiz could draw before he could even talk and by the age of three he could draw on command. His introduction to art was through religious images he was exposed to at local churches His paintings are influenced by artists such as Hieronymus Bosch, Peter Bruegel the Elder, and Gregory Gillespie. Ruiz primarily works in oil, watercolors, and acrylic, and his paintings focus on Chicano culture, and his own family heritage. His son, Ricardo V. Ruiz, is an artist and printmaker. Ricardo Ruiz the Elder has been working as an artist for over 35 years.

== Education ==
Ruiz obtained his bachelor's degree in fine arts in 1984 from Corpus Christi State University. Twenty-two years later he returned to graduate school to get his master's degree in fine arts from Texas A&M, Corpus Christi in 2014.

== Artworks ==
One of Ruiz' well known pieces is his Love Songs for the Palomia, a painting of a grackle wearing a fez hat and in front of a bright green background. He used a grackle as his subject because in Corpus Christi they would always be around him since he was a child. However, he had never seen a dead one so it became an inside joke that grackles have the same longevity as humans which would also give them the same abilities to be civilized as well. The word “Palomia” is slang for “people of the neighborhood” which Ruiz considers an endearing name for the people around him. Many of Ruiz’ inspirations come from a blend of Renaissance art, Catholicism, folklore, and Mexican American culture. Other artists Ruiz finds inspiring are Frida Kahlo, Gregory Gillespie, Thomas Hart Benton, Edward Hopper, and Donald Wilson. His work is described as examining “the commonality of the life experience.”

== Exhibitions ==
=== Solo exhibitions ===
- 2019, There Is Something I Want To Tell You. The Narrative Paintings of Ricardo Ruiz, at the Martha Fenstermaker Memorial Visual Arts Gallery at Laredo College.

=== Group exhibitions ===
- 1985 - Texas A&M University's Weil Gallery
- 1986 - Art Museum of Southern Texas
- 1999 - Cheech Marin Center for Chicano Art

== Collections ==
Ricardo Ruiz's works can be found in the permanent collection of Cheech Marin Center for Chicano Art, Texas A&M University Weil Gallery, and the Art Museum of Southern Texas.
