= Lawrence Louis Barrett =

American lithographer

- Born: December 11, 1897; Guthrie
- Died: 1973 (aged 75–76); Colorado Springs
- Alma mater: Colorado Springs Fine Arts Center
- Awards: Guggenheim Fellowship (visual arts, 1940)

Lawrence Barrett or Lawrence Louis Barrett (1897 – 1973) was an American artist. He is known for his lithographs and as a printmaking teacher.

Barrett was born in Guthrie, Oklahoma on December 11, 1897. He studied at the Broadmoor Art Academy (now the Colorado Springs Fine Arts Center). He taught at the Colorado Springs Fine Arts Center from 1938 through 1952.

In 1940 he was awarded a Guggenheim Fellowship.

Barrett died in Colorado Springs in 1973.

His work is in the Blanton Museum of Art, the Kirkland Museum of Fine & Decorative Art, the Metropolitan Museum of Art, and the Nelson-Atkins Museum of Art. He created lithographs with Howard Cook, George Biddle and Adolf Arthur Dehn.
