= Vernon Fisher =

American multimedia artist

Fish by Fisher, 2002, oil on blackboard slating

Vernon Fisher (1943–2023) was an multimedia artist born in Fort Worth, Texas. He earned a BA in English literature from Hardin–Simmons University in 1967 and an MFA from the University of Illinois at Urbana–Champaign in 1969. He taught at Austin College and later at University of North Texas.

Fisher was best known for his paintings that resemble chalk on a school blackboard, often with incongruous elements added. Fish, in the collection of the Honolulu Museum of Art, is an example these "blackboard paintings".

The Art Institute of Chicago, the Hirshhorn Museum and Sculpture Garden (Washington, D.C.), the Honolulu Museum of Art, the Modern Art Museum of Fort Worth, the Museum of Contemporary Art, Chicago, the Museum of Fine Arts, Houston, the Phoenix Art Museum, the San Francisco Museum of Modern Art and the Solomon R. Guggenheim Museum (New York City) are among the public collections holding work by Fisher.
