= El Paso Museum of Art =

Art museum in El Paso, Texas

Coordinates: 31.7586°N 106.4903°W

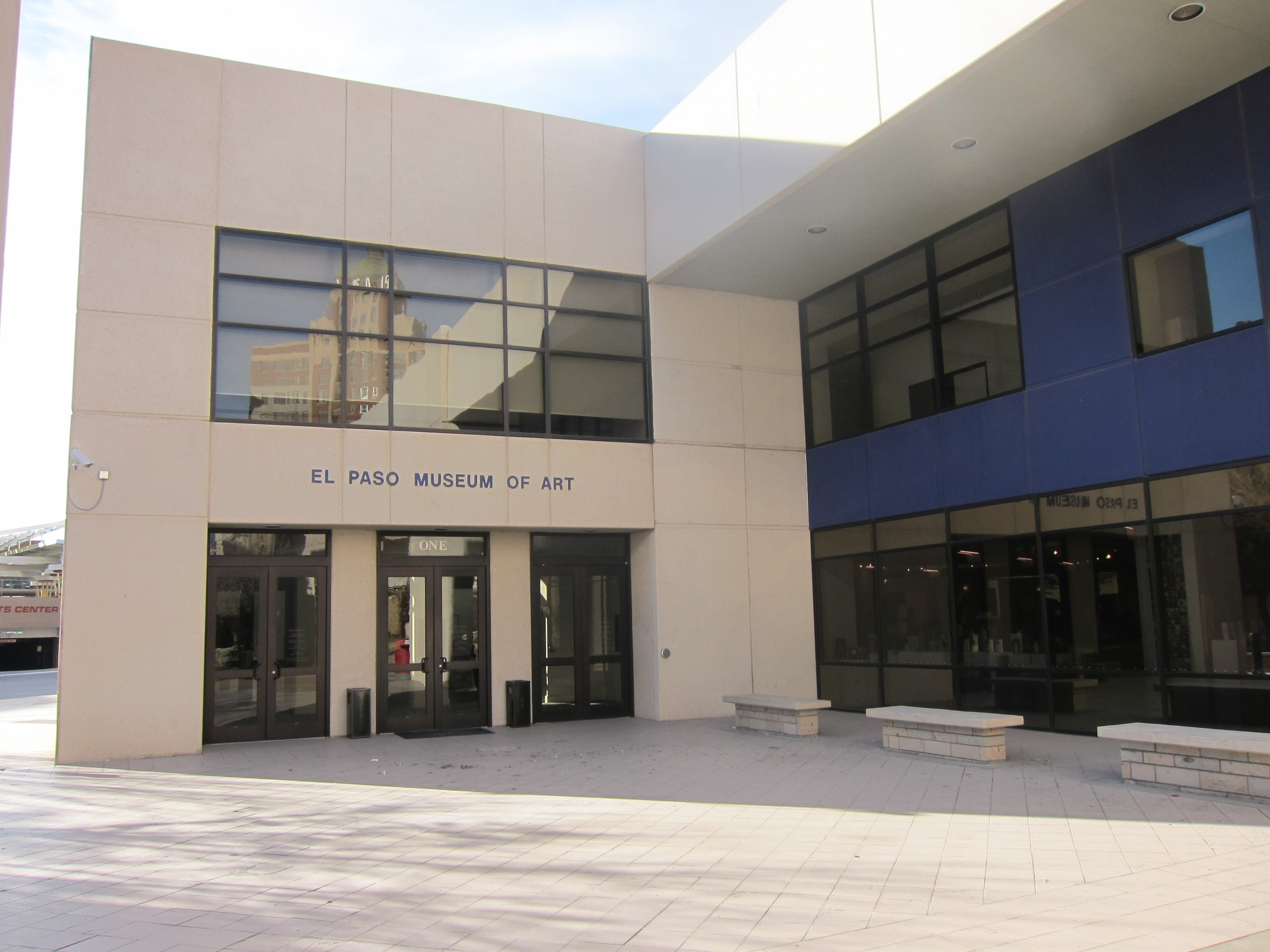
El Paso Museum of Art

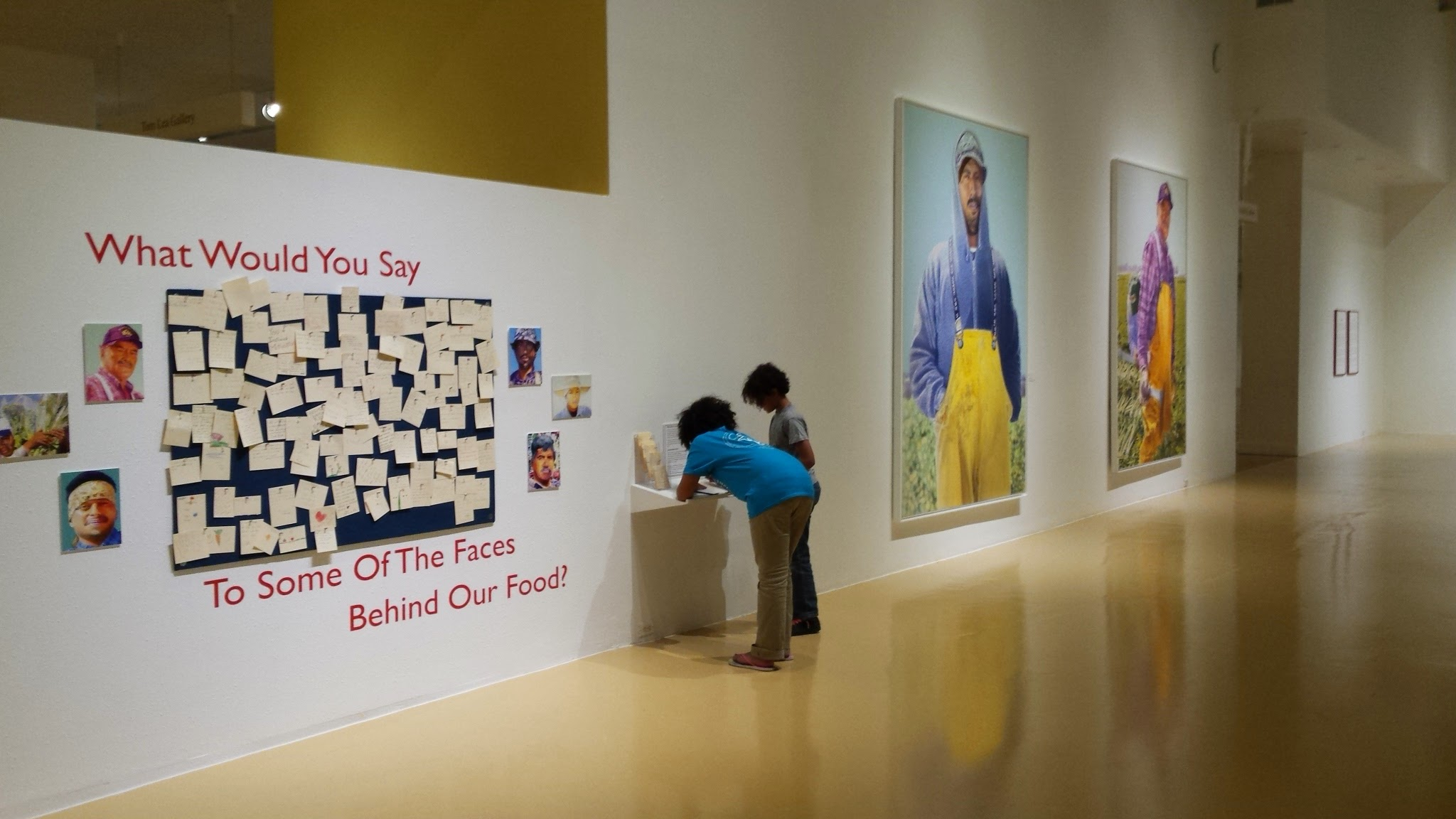
El Paso Museum of Art Migrant Worker Exhibit

Founded in 1959, The El Paso Museum of Art (EPMA) is located in downtown El Paso, Texas. First accredited in 1972, it is the only accredited art museum within a 250-mile radius and serves approximately 100,000 visitors per year. A new building was completed in 1998. In addition to its permanent collection and special exhibitions, the museum also offers art classes, film series, lectures, concerts, storytelling sessions and other educational programs to the West Texas, Southern New Mexico and Ciudad Juarez, Mexico community.

== Collections ==
It is best known for its 57-piece Samuel H. Kress collection of 12th–18th-century European Art including works by Bernardo Bellotto, Benedetto Bonfigli, Canaletto, Giovanni Benedetto Castiglione, Vincenzo Catena, Giuseppe Maria Crespi, Carlo Crivelli, Vittore Crivelli, Macrino d'Alba, Jacopo da Sellaio, Nicolò da Voltri, Juan de Borgoña, Jacopo del Sellaio, Martino di Bartolomeo, Giovanni di Paolo, Giovanni Andrea de Ferrari, Sano di Pietro, Battista Dossi, Lavinia Fontana, Artemisia Gentileschi, Juan de Valdés Leal, Benvenuto Tisi (called il Garofalo), Filippino Lippi, Lorenzo Lotto, Alessandro Magnasco, the Master of the Bambino Vispo, Bartolomé Esteban Murillo, Giacomo Pacchiarotti, Andrea Previtali, Hyacinthe Rigaud, Pietro Rotari, Bernardo Strozzi, Anthony van Dyck, and Francisco Zurbarán. The permanent collection includes North American works of art by Manuel Gregorio Acosta, Frank Duveneck, Childe Hassam, George Inness, Manuel Neri, Rembrandt Peale, Frederic Remington, and Gilbert Stuart, among others.

The museum has developed a major collection of contemporary Southwestern United States and Mexican artists with an emphasis on Texas, New Mexico, and the border region including works by Ho Baron, Julie Bozzi, Carlos Callejo, Susan Davidoff, James Drake, Gaspar Enríquez, Vernon Fisher, Carmen Lomas Garza, Harry Geffert, Sam Gilliam, Gronk, Becky Hendrick, Anna Jaquez, Luis Jiménez, Donald Judd, Ida Lansky, Jim Love, Gilbert Lujan, James Magee, Melissa Miller, Jesús Moroles, Celia Álvarez Muñoz, Kermit Oliver, Ray Parish, Nadezda Prvulovic, Linda Ridgway, María Sada, Fritz Scholder, James Surls, Willie Varela, and Shane Wiggs. Other special collections include Pre-Columbian and Mexican colonial art, early 19th-century through the mid 20th-century American art, and a collection of works on paper including Old Master, 19th-century, and American Scene prints, reproductive engravings, and photographs.

== See also ==
- List of museums in West Texas
