= Plaza de la Raza =

- Founded: 1970; 56 years ago
- Location: Lincoln Park, Los Angeles
- Website: www.plazadelaraza.org

The Plaza de la Raza (Place of the People) is a multidisciplinary cultural arts and educational center located in Lincoln Park in East Los Angeles, California. It was founded in 1970 by actress Margo Albert and trade union activist Frank S. López. The center was originally divided into two arms, one providing educational classes for children and adults and the other a professional theater training group. By the twenty-first century a full curriculum in theater, dance, music and arts was provided to hundreds of students yearly.

Foundation of the center prompted enthusiasm from both sides of the border. Mexican masons from Tijuana constructed and donated a children's playground in Aztec motifs. Speaking before a joint hearing of the United States Congress concerning a possible White House Conference on the Arts, Margo Albert testified that the Plaza de la Raza had thoroughly revitalized the Lincoln Park area and stated that it had served 36,000 community members in 1977 alone.

In addressing an appropriations subcommittee of the United States House of Representatives in the days after the 1992 Los Angeles riots, A. B. Spellman representing the National Endowment for the Arts asserted that the unrest was less severe on the east side of the city because Plaza de la Raza and similar institutions held the community together.

In 2019 LA Weekly called Plaza de la Raza "an Eastside Cultural Capitol."
