= Riverside Art Museum =

American art museum in California

- Built 1929, originally the YWCA

- Location within California
- Established: 1967
- Location: 3425 Mission Inn Avenue, Riverside, California
- Coordinates: 33°58′54″N 117°22′14″W
- Type: Art museum
- Director: Drew Oberjuerge
- Curators: Lindsey Rossi and Carolyn Schutten
- Website: riversideartmuseum.org
- Old YWCA Building
- U.S. National Register of Historic Places
- Riverside Landmark
- Built: 1929
- Architect: Julia Morgan, Nethery Construction Company
- Architectural style: Late 19th and 20th Century Revivals: Mediterranean Revival, Classical Revival
- NRHP reference No.: 82002227
- RIVL No.: 18
- Added to NRHP: January 28, 1982

Riverside Art Museum is an art museum in the historic Mission Inn District of Riverside, California. The museum is a non-profit organization which focuses on addressing social issues and offers art classes as well as other events in order to inspire and build community.

The building was originally design by Julia Morgan to serve the Young Women's Christian Association (YWCA) in 1929. YWCAs provided important spaces for women to a part of the urban environment. The Riverside YWCA was purchased by the Riverside Art Association in 1967. The Riverside Art Association wanted to expand their collection and include more classes to be more accessible for the public. The building was placed on the National Register of Historic Places in 1982.

== History ==
In 1929, the Riverside YWCA selected the corner of 7th (now Mission Inn Avenue) and Lime Streets as the site for its new building. YWCA building projects relied on fundraising and donations so Frank Miller convinced the organization to build next to the Mission Inn in exchange for his help in financing the project. The association's directors hired architect Julia Morgan to design the building over the objections of Miller, who wanted an architect who would design the building in the Mission Revival Style architecture. To Miller's disapproval Morgan designed the building in Mediterranean Revival and Classical Revival styles and added a pool. Today, the pool is polled as a major asset to members of the museum.

In 1960, the Riverside Art Center began fundraising to purchase the YWCA building, which had recently come onto the market. The size of the Riverside YWCA made it ideal for the Association's new exhibitions and classes. On July 5, 1967, the YWCA officially sold the building to the Riverside Arts Center for $250,000.

In 1982, the building was designated a Registered Historic Place and a city historic landmark.

In 1992, a three-phase renovation of the building was undertaken with the financial assistance of the City of Riverside and generous donations. The renovations included a climate-control system, a library, a glass roof for the garden atrium, the addition of an office, and more space for exhibitions, storage, and the kitchen.

== Architecture ==
Morgan's design features reinforced concrete, wooden frames, glass doors and a terra-cotta tiled roof to give the building a modern feeling next to the Mission Inn. The building combines elements of Mediterranean and Classical architecture in an "innovative tri-block design". The first floor originally housed a swimming pool, an open-air atrium, and a gymnasium. The second floor featured bedrooms, offices, and meeting rooms with a small stage. On the roof was a badminton court.

A garden, and an outdoor fireplace were added in the late 1930s as a memorial to Ruth Muir, former Secretary (Executive Director), after she was brutally assaulted and murdered at the age of 48, while vacationing in La Jolla.

== Exhibitions ==
The Riverside Art Museum mounts an average of 20 exhibitions per year, some of which are travelling exhibitions, of "art that addresses social issues, diverse themes and a range of media techniques".

The permanent collection of the Riverside Art Museum consists of approximately 1500 pieces including artists like Karl Benjamin, Rex Brandt, Millard Sheets, and Marc Chagall. Some of their permanent collection is available for online viewing like that of Leonard Baskin, Doris Rosenthal, and prints from the Sosaku-Hanga.

Often the Riverside Art Museum also showcases pieces done by students and the community. Past exhibits have showcased national and international artists and collections, the American Institute of Architects / U.S Green Building Council's 2008 Regional Architectural Design Awards Exhibition, and member exhibits.

== Programs ==
The Riverside Art Museum hosts educational classes and workshops for all ages, community projects, museum tours, and birthday parties.

== The Cheech Marin Center for Chicano Art & Culture ==
The Cheech Marin Center for Chicano Art & Culture of the Riverside Art Museum opened in June 2022. It is a public-private partnership between Riverside Art Museum, the City of Riverside, and comedian Cheech Marin. The Cheech houses and exhibits Marin's private collection of Chicano art. Cheech Marin was quoted: "Together, we hope to bring every aspect of Chicano art to this region as well as the rest of the world. We have something wonderful to give." The Cheech is located at 3581 Mission Inn Avenue in Riverside.

== Gallery ==
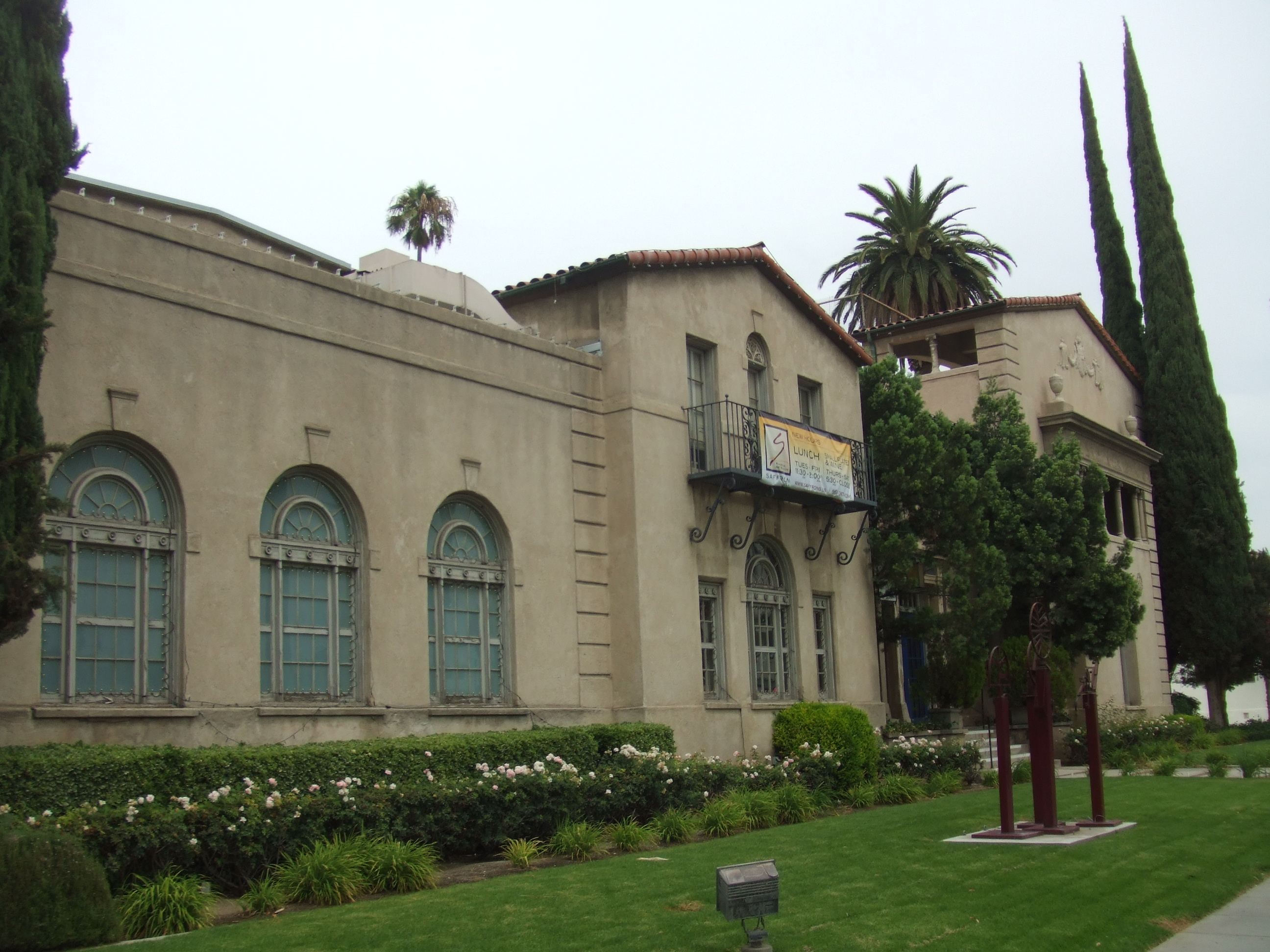
The Riverside Art Museum in 2009.

== See also ==
- List of YWCA buildings
- List of works by Julia Morgan
- List of museums in the Inland Empire
- List of landmarks in Riverside, California
- National Register of Historic Places listings in Riverside County, California
