= Mel Casas =

American painter

Melesio "Mel" Casas
- Born: November 24, 1929; El Paso, Texas, U.S.
- Died: November 30, 2014 (aged 85); San Antonio, Texas, U.S.
- Known for: Chicano Art and Writing
- Notable work: Humanscape 62
- Spouse: Grace Casas
- Website: www.melcasas.com

Melesio "Mel" Casas (November 24, 1929 – November 30, 2014) was an American artist, activist, writer and teacher. He is best known for a cycle of complex, large-scale paintings characterized by cutting wit, incisive cultural and political analysis, and verbal and visual puns that he called Humanscapes, which were painted between 1965 and 1989. Only a few of these Humanscapes address Chicano topics, though they are his most famous paintings, and "have appeared repeatedly in books and exhibitions" and "are rightfully regarded as formative icons of the Chicano art movement." Many of the Humanscape paintings, by contrast, are little known, as is much of the work Casas produced in the following quarter century.

Journalists frequently note that Casas uses paintings to "address cultural stereotypes." However, few of his Humanscape paintings (only six) explicitly treat Chicano topics, and few of those treat stereotypes: "Casas rarely dealt with ethnicity or stereotypes in an explicit manner in his 150+ Humanscape cycle of paintings (1965-1989). Two of his greatest paintings Humanscape 62 (Brownies of the Southwest) (1970) and Humanscape 68 (Kitchen Spanish) (1973), are brilliant and complex expositions of stereotypic attitudes. His Southwestern Clichés, the last 35 of his Humanscape paintings, of course deal with clichés, but only two include stereotypic images: Humanscape 135 (#2 Mexican Plate), 1984; and Humanscape 145 (SW Cliché), 1987." It has been argued that, given the broad range of his subject matter, Casas should "also be regarded as a major American artist."

Casas' Humanscapes have been collected by the Whitney Museum of American Art; San Antonio Museum of Art; Smithsonian American Art Museum; Museum of Fine Arts, Houston; McNay Art Museum; and the Crystal Bridges Museum of American Art (Bentonville, Arkansas). In 2018, two of his Humanscapes were purchased for the Henry B. Gonzalez Convention Center in San Antonio. His work is held in national and international private collectors. Casas' Humanscape paintings can be broken down into several topics, each of which follows a serial progression. Casas, who served as president of the Con Safo art group (1971–73), was a well known teacher, writer, theorist, and public intellectual whose business card listed him as a "cultural adjuster." At San Antonio College, Casas "taught an entire generation of artists in San Antonio, many of whom went on to have successful careers as artists, teachers, gallerists, and arts administrators."

Casas' "Brown Paper Report," written in 1971, is an important Chicano and American cultural document. Casas emphasized the importance of "self-determination" and equality for Chicanos/as. Regarded nationally as one of the foundational figures of Chicano Art, Casas has also been called "the most influential of those artists who spent their careers in Texas during the second half of the twentieth century." Casas felt that once artists had a fair chance to exhibit in the United States, they would be accepted as American artists and become part of "Americana."

== Early life and education ==
Casas was born in El Paso, Texas to Mexican American parents during the Great Depression. He grew up and lived in El Segundo Barrio. His father's love of drawing influenced Casas to start drawing, and, as a young man, he decided to become an artist. Casas had a good elementary and junior high school education, and he chose El Paso High School—which had mostly Anglo students—in order to get a better education. Alienated from the other students because of his background and heavy Mexican accent, Casas experienced discrimination for the first time. After graduating from high school in 1948, Casas worked for Pacific Fruit Express, a railroad company, as an iceman, and he helped with his father's Swedish massage business located in downtown El Paso.

Later, Casas was called into the United States Army and his father insisted it was his duty to serve. Casas served in the Korean War from 1950 to 1953, where he was wounded and subsequently awarded a Purple Heart for bravery in the war.

Casas attended college on the G.I. Bill, initially studying psychology, but he changed to art and teaching due to practical considerations. Receiving a strong background in art theory, drawing and painting, Casas earned a BA in 1956 from Texas Western College (now the University of Texas at El Paso). Casas went to graduate school in Mexico, and he received a MFA from the University of the Americas in Mexico City in 1958.

== Academic and Art Careers ==
Casas received an all-level certificate to teach in Texas. Regarded by his students as a "generous" teacher, he helping to launch many young art careers. Casas taught art at Jefferson High School in El Paso, Texas for three years, where one of his students was Gaspar Enriquez. and after that, he received a job offer at San Antonio College. In comparison to his native El Paso, which Casas noted had very "open" race relations, Casas described San Antonio as a "colonized" city.

Casas served as president of the San Antonio-based Con Safo art group (1971–73). Con Safo is a Pachuco slang expression whose most common meanings are: "the same to you," "don't mess with this," and "forbidden to touch." In its abbreviated form, C/S, it is commonly used to protect murals from defacement. The art group adopted the name "Con Safo" at Casas' suggestion on December 19, 1971, at which time Casas presented his "Brown Paper Report," which lists 22 "mostly sardonic definitions" for the term Con Safo. The six co-founders of El Grupo regard Con Safo as the final reorganization of the group they cofounded in 1968. Casas, who initially thought he was co-founding a new group, subsequently concurred in this assessment. In December 1971, the Con Safo group consisted of Felipe Reyes, Jose Esquivel, Jesse Almazán, Roberto Ríos, and Jose Garza (Jesse "Chista" Cantú, the other El Grupo member, was excluded at this time), and the two newly inducted members, Mel Casas and Jesse Treviño (the latter was Casas' student at San Antonio College). Other notable artists who subsequently joined the group include Rudy Treviño (who subsequently served as the group's last president), Santos Martínez, César Martínez, Amado Peña, Jr., Carmen Lomas Garza, Kathy Vargas, Roberto Gonzalez, and Rolando Briseño. In its later years, after some of the older artists dropped out of the group, a high proportion of group members were students of Casas at San Antonio College. At group meetings, members discussed Chicano art and politics, as well as other social and political issues. They also gained artistic exposure by participating in exhibitions. Beginning in 1972, the group required insurance and charged exhibiting institutions a fee. Con Safo was one of the earliest and most important Chicano art groups, and it helped Chicano art receive recognition when Chicanos and their work were largely excluded from museums and galleries.

Casas taught for 29 years at San Antonio College where he was Chair of the Art Department for 12 years. He enjoyed teaching a "very good cross-section of the city," but serving as chair was stressful, since he was often on call. He retired in 1990. Afterward, Casas and his wife Grace went to Italy, spending two years in Brindisi and two in Sicily.

=== Critical reception ===
Casas often paid a price for his trenchant social criticism. He was designated "Artist of the Year" by the San Antonio Art League for 1968, only to have this honor revoked three days later. Casas, who referred to the dominant notion of beauty as the "Barbie doll ideal," spoke of the privileges of blond hair and blue eyes while he undressed a Barbie doll during his San Antonio Art League lecture, which is why his award was taken away.

As a fellow artist, he was good at asking critical questions of the work of others and encouraging them to submit their work to exhibitions and competitions.

== Personal life ==
Casas had a two-year battle with cancer. He died in his home with his family and his wife of 35 years, Grace Casas. He and Grace had one child, Bruce. With his first wife, Maria, Mel had four children: Alfredo, Ingrid, Mike and Sonya.

== Artistic Practice ==
Casas was first recognized for his work in an abstract expressionist style, the "typical," dominant mode of painting in this period in the United States. Casas came to feel that his abstract work was too "pretty," and that it was an inappropriate artistic language for him. Casas, it is said, also believed that "artists shouldn't merely imitate subject matter or painterly styles emanating from Europe or New York." He began transitioning to a representational style in 1965, when he began his Humanscape series. Though Casas is best known for a handful of Humanscape paintings that treat Chicano themes, this cycle features an unusually wide array of works with varied themes, styles, and objects of criticism, and a number of his post-Humanscape works also address social issues.

"I so divide the picture plane of my paintings so as to force the spectator into the role of ‘voyeur’ thus acquiring an identity through participation. The effect is a kind of sacred conversation, an invitation to participate in what could be a pornographic fantasy."

— Mel Casas, 1968, “Artist’s Statement.” In Mel Casas Paintings. Exhibition catalog. San Antonio: Mexican American Institute of Cultural Exchange. (Quoted in Cordova, Ruben C. (2011). "The Cinematic Genesis of the Mel Casas Humanscape, 1965-1967". Aztlán. 36 (2).)

It has been argued that because Casas wrote the phrase “to destroy stereotypes and demolish visual clichés” in a document called "A Contingency Factor" in 1972, journalists and writers have taken this statement as "an interpretive keystone or blueprint" for his oeuvre, and they have utilized the phrase to characterize his art. But, of the approximately 800 art works Casas created, "only a handful treat Chicano subjects, and of these, even fewer feature recognizable stereotypical images." As one critic noted, "Though he was loath to adhere to any single artistic perspective, he is credited with infusing the Chicano art movement with sharp wit and intellectualism, invigorating (and inciting) his peers and empowering his successors to do the same."

In 2024, his work was included in Xican-a.o.x. Body, a major group exhibition on the contributions by Chicano artists to the realm of visual arts. The show was first on view at Cheech Marin Center for Chicano Art & Culture of the Riverside Art Museum, California, and the Pérez Art Museum Miami, Florida.

=== The Humanscape Cycle of Paintings, 1965-1989 ===
The 153 paintings that make up the Humanscape series were inspired by a "glimpse of a drive-in movie screen." Curator Ruben C. Cordova organized four Humanscape exhibitions with approximately half of the Humanscape paintings in 2015. Critic Dan Goddard called the exhibitions "a spectacular multi-exhibit tribute tracing almost the entire progression of Casas' 150 Humanscape paintings from 1965 to 1989." The curator referred to the Humanscapes as "one of the most remarkable series of paintings in the history of American art." The Surreal nature of the Humanscape cycle and the artist's role as an artistic trailblazer were recognized in a Whitney American Art Museum essay in 2025.

Cordova divides the Humanscapes into five groups. Prior to his 150 numbered Humanscapes, Casas made three black-and-white paintings (labeled A, B, and C) in 1965 that the artist retrospectively included in the series. They depict a couple having sex and two embryonic figures. According to the curator, Casas' ideas "had to gestate before he found the inspiration to focus on cinema and spectatorship as explicit, extended subjects." In the first group, from 1965 through 1967, Casas made depictions of audience members watching films at drive-in cinemas and conventional movie theaters, characterized as "psychologically intense, somewhat blurry dreamscapes." These paintings, it is argued, "directly address the power of dominant media images," because "mass media shape and form their viewing subjects," and "media image and viewing subject become locked in an infinitely reflective embrace." Casas noted that he intended social criticism from the start of the series, "because I wanted to put cinema in the context of social life." Gradually, the "passive, spectral automatons" within Casas' paintings "became fleshed-out actors on their own stage... endowed with color, substance, and volition," and, as they turn towards the viewers of his paintings, they appear to "vogue" for their "delectation" and to "vie with the cinema image as a depiction of the 'real.'” These developments, however, "undercut the fiction that the viewers of the paintings are looking at an audience looking at a film."

From late 1967 through 1970, many Humanscape paintings dealt with the Sexual Revolution. The 2014 exhibition at FL!GHT featured ten paintings, commencing with B, C, and Humanscape 2 (1965) (the latter is Casas' only extant depiction of a drive-in, since he destroyed 20 of his earliest Humanscapes). The exhibition culminated in Humanscape 50 (Bare Baby Brick, 1968), described as "a Pop masterpiece from the Sexual Revolution period" whose enormous red lipstick was Casas at "his most Freudian."

Casas began making politically themed paintings in 1968, and he emphasized this subject matter from 1970 through 1975. The aim of the exhibition of political paintings at the Guadalupe Cultural Arts Center in 2015 was to provide "a more complete picture of Casas' far-ranging and probing intellect, his caustic wit, playful and ironic sense of humor, and the complexity and open-endedness with which he addressed social issues in the 1960s and 1970s."

From 1975 through 1981, Casas' favorite theme was art about art, in paintings that, as one critic noted, "satirized art history and poked fun at the art market and contemporary artists." Commencing with Humanscape 74 (Deux Champ Stripped Bare by his Art, 1975), "a punning, multilingual reference to Marcel Duchamp... Casas sometimes takes another artist’s style out for a spin," including Lichtenstein, Matisse, and Pollock. Finally, from 1982 through 1989, the last group of Humanscapes treated what Casas called Southwestern clichés. The experimentation with multiple styles and techniques that Casas utilized in his Art About Art series was continued in his Southwestern clichés.

The Southwestern clichés are said to "reflect an extraordinary sense of place." During the production of this series, Casas transitioned from working primarily with paint brushes to working primarily by pouring and dripping paint. He utilized jars, squeeze bottles, barbecue skewers, and chopsticks (the latter two implements were also used to manipulate paint once it was on the canvas). In these works, Casas used "increasingly thicker paint and brighter colors," whose visual effects "have often been compared to the high-keyed colors found in ceramic tiles." Casas eschewed brushes, says the curator, because he wanted these works to be "about paint, about materiality, and he didn’t want the traces of the brush left in it."

Humanscape 62 (1970) at the Smithsonian American Art Museum in 2023

In his Humanscapes, Casas focuses on diverse sources of imagery, often taken from popular culture, and how these media images affect viewers, which Casas referred to as "voyeurs." Since his earliest Humanscapes, Casas utilized the term to conflate spectators within his pictures with external viewers of his pictures. The Humanscape paintings address various issues, including spectatorship and mass media, war, the sexual revolution, Nixon-era politics, gun violence in the U.S., assassinations, the objectification of women, art movements and fashions, and Southwestern clichés. His incorporation of imagery from Mexican and Pre-Columbian iconography in conjunction with pop art in Humanscape 62 was unique. Casas' satirical subject matter was often considered "provocative," which was an intended effect, since Casas stated: "As a matter of fact, my paintings are totally confrontational."

Inspired by Marshall McLuhan's The Mechanical Bride: The Folklore of Industrial Man (1951), Casas was concerned that media, such as television, film, and advertising had incredible power to manipulate people, often unconsciously through erotic subjects. He also followed McLuhan in regarding anonymity as a hallmark of the mass culture that characterized modern life. The Humanscapes are mostly large-scale paintings. After experimenting with different sizes, he settled on a 6 x 8' format once he made Humanscape 33 in July 1967, because he wanted a canvas size that would suggest the experience of viewing a cinema screen. As he put it, this canvas size best "expressed the ratio of cinema to the real world." Cinema signs he had utilized in the foregrounds of five of his paintings inspired the use of punning subtitles. The first painting with a subtitle was Humanscape 40 (Game), made in January 1968. Thereafter, his paintings had a tripartite structure, with a large "screen image" in a rectangular format, one or more foreground images, and a pithy text in the lower foreground. This structure generated verbal/visual puns, and multiple entendres, enabling Casas to utilize his deep knowledge of Romance languages, including slang, connotations, and denotations. The texts chosen as subtitles for the Humanscapes served to create what the artist called "conundrums," meant to provoke the viewer to question and re-interpret the images to which they are juxtaposed.

=== Later Paintings, 1990-2013 ===
Casas painted more than 600 paintings after the Humanscape series had come to an end. They are characterized as "mostly small drip paintings," and while some of them "treat social issues, the vast majority are semi-nude females, still lifes, and fetishistic images of women’s shoes." As noted above, Casas and his wife Grace moved to Italy for several years after Casas retired in 1990, and it would not have been practical to continue making large scale paintings, as he had been doing in the U.S. The shoe series was inspired by fashionable women's shoes when Casas was living in Italy.

Stylistically, Casas continued where he had left off with the Southwestern Clichés, since most of his post-Humanscape paintings were made by pouring and dripping paint. A number of these relatively small post-Humanscape paintings are reproduced in Mel Casas: Artist as Cultural Adjuster. and American History Does not Begin with the White Man: Indigenous Themes in the Work of Mel Casas. The latter accompanied an exhibition of the same name mounted at Bihl Haus for San Antonio's Tricentennial.

In his later years, Casas didn't like talking about his art, and he largely ceased exhibiting, even turning down offers of major exhibitions. These rejected opportunities, says Cordova, "would have helped solidify his legacy." Casas' last gallery exhibition was “Scopophilia: Enjoying Looking,” at the Joan Grona Gallery in San Antonio in 2000. But he continued to paint almost daily, even when he was battling cancer. Casas never cared very much about marketing or selling his art, because his income came from teaching. This gave him the freedom to "paint what I wanted. Painting as search. I didn't have to worry about the art market. If it sold, it was like gravy."

Shortly before his death in 2014, Casas was given a retrospective exhibition at San Antonio College called “Mel Casas: Artist as Cultural Adjuster,” which featured 76 paintings (most of them small works) created between 1965 and 2012.

His memorial exhibition, "Mel Casas Memorial Exhibition: From First to Last," was held at Centro de Artes in San Antonio, then administered by Texas A&M University-San Antonio. It featured 25 paintings, beginning with Thanatos #2 (c. 1965)--a rare extant Abstract Expressionist-style painting because Casas destroyed nearly all of his pre-Humanscape work—and ending with his last work, Roy Lichtenskin Stiletto, completed on June 27, 2013. The Memorial exhibition featured a survey of small paintings, as well as what was billed as "the largest showing of the Humanscapes in more than twenty years." Because Casas' work had been so little seen in recent decades, it was at this exhibition that curator and critic David S. Rubin "became aware of the scope and breadth of Casas’ aesthetic achievement. Casas clearly was in tune with the art movements of the 1960s, and had mastered formalism, Pop art, and conceptual art by the end of that decade."

At the McNay Art Museum in San Antonio, Mel Casas: Human (September 20, 2018 – January 6, 2019) featured six Humanscape paintings and eight of Casas' art boxes. Mel Casas: Human was mounted in conjunction with the exhibition Pop América, 1965–1975.
