= Deborah Keller-Rihn =

Deborah Keller-Rihn is an artist, educator, curator, and community arts organizer who is based in San Antonio, Texas. She has a BA from the University of Texas in San Antonio, an MA from Texas A & M University--Kingsville, as well as other certifications and forms of training. She is particularly interested in Feminine mythology and Hinduism, as intellectual pursuits as well as sources of inspiration for her art. Keller-Rihn has primarily exhibited as a photographer in recent years. James A. McKinnis describes her hand colored photographs as "both delicate and sensual." He discusses her technique, and says she "carefully combines color and composition to create elaborate images that she sometimes further enhances through collage" and objects such as beads, gold leaf, glitter, etc.

Keller-Rihn has directed an art space at the Blue Star Art Complex for more than 25 years, where she has organized monthly exhibitions, for a total of more than 3,000 exhibitions. Previously known as the Keller-Rihn Studio, since 2020, it had been called the Blue Star Arts Collective. In addition to conventional art exhibitions, Keller-Rihn hosts related cultural events, including installations, performances, and musical and literary recitals. These include the Mandala Healing Arts project in 2015, as well as a photography exhibition that served as the final project for 40 of Keller-Rihn's students at Northwest Vista College.

== Education, teaching, curating ==
Keller-Rihn Attended Winston Churchill High School in San Antonio. She received a BA in Humanities at the University of Texas in San Antonio in 1981. She earned a Teaching Certificate in Reading and Communications in 1985, and a Teaching Certificate in Secondary Art Education in 1986, both from the University of Texas at Austin. Keller-Rihn received an MA in Art in 2001 from Texas A & M University, Kingsville. Her thesis topic was "Symbolic Transformation and the Creation of a Personal Mythology." She attended institutes for additional certification in 1996, 1998, 2003, and 2008.

Four trips to India have broadened Keller-Rihn's interests in Eastern culture, philosophy, and art forms. She participated in a cultural exchange as a "special guest" with Stella Maris College in India in 2011-12, where she witnessed and photographed various cultural practices for her studies, especially kolams (rice flour paintings by women), which feature in a number of her photographs. From 2017-2023, she studied Integral Yoga and Psychology at the Sri Aurobindo Centre of Advanced Research in Pondicherry, India.

Keller-Rihn has taught at all educational levels, from elementary school to college. In addition to her work at Blue Star and her independent curating, she has served as assistant curator of education at the San Antonio Museum of Art, arts program manager at the Centro Cultural Aztlan, and program director at Bihl Haus, all in San Antonio.

== Artistic philosophy ==
In the catalog for her 2024 retrospective of hand-colored photographs titled The Evolution of a Feminine Mythology at St. Mary's University, Keller-Rihn notes that her work constitutes "a search for the Divine Feminine and the integration of the worldly and the transcendent. Indeed, the spiritual manifests in matter as I attempt to demonstrate how beauty can transform consciousness and enlighten a divided world." One critic noted Keller-Rihn's explorations of Hinduism and Tibetan Buddhism, and how she "delves deeply into the mythic dimensions of feminine iconography and their sources, but always with concern for the individuality of her female models." Critic Elda Silva notes how the artist utilized green, her late mother's favorite color, as personal symbolism in an altar in her honor erected at Magical Realism Studio in 2001. She also used "a photograph of a young woman as the Green Tara, known as the mother of all Buddhas... Another young woman is photographed as the Hindu goddess Ishtar, who represents triumph over suffering." In a review of the same exhibition, Goddard notes how the artist utilized "a beautiful African-American model as the spirit of Kali" and thereby "creates a new image of an ancient symbol of feminine power," achieving "a sense of the sacred that seems to predate most organized religion." Keller-Rihn's interest in cross-cultural beliefs was utilized in a Day of the Dead exhibition in 2009, when her image of the Hindu goddess Kali was compared to the life/death dualism that are features of the Aztec goddess Coatlicue.

== Exhibitions as artist ==
Keller-Rihn exhibited a photograph, which won the grand prize, at the Works on Paper group exhibition at the Guadalupe Cultural Arts Center in 1989. In 1991, she was in a four-women show called Allusions at Centro Cultural Aztlan, where critic Marcia Goren Weser discussed her hand-painted photographs, noting their distorted, surreal qualities, and calling "Still Life with Rainbow Priestess" her "tour de force with its repetitive images of a woman in a hall of windows and torn fragments of a face." One of Keller's photos served as the invitation's image. In 1992, critic Dan R. Goddard noted Keller-Rihn's box "The Person Within" as an example of the mixed media works that were among the exhibition's best. Also in 1992, at the Carver Community Cultural Center's "Inner Personae--A Journey into Ourselves" exhibition, Marcia Goren Weser describes Keller-Rihn's work as "mixing media to create mood poems," to achieve "rare insight into the power of the psychological shadow."

Keller-Rihn has regularly participated in annual exhibitions on various themes at the Centro Cultural Aztlan in San Antonio, commencing with the Dia de los Muertos show in 1994. In 1995, she made an ofrenda (offering or altar) for the Dia de los Muertos exhibition at the Centro Cultural Aztlan, which featured photographs, mirrors, and lights. Keller-Rihn participated in the "Les Femmes: Now Into Tomorrow" show at the Centro Cultural Aztlan, where Dan Goddard noted that the artist "digs deep for these earthly images." Keller-Rihn's "images of girls in mystical places" at a 1997 show at the Centro Cultural Aztlan is said to cross "between the familiar and cosmic with excellent compositions and fabulous hand coloring." In 1999 she exhibited hand-colored photographs, in collaboration with Ramin Samandari, at ART2KPASA: A Millenial Survey of San Antonio Artists at the San Antonio International Airport, curated by Michael Mehl. Their images of woman reference Tarot cards. She participated in the Spirituality and Creativity show at the Southwest School of Arts and Craft, curated by Kathy Armstrong.

Keller-Rihn's "Symbolic Transformation" was the featured image in the article on the SAFOTO 2000 biennial held at several galleries. She was also featured in the FOTOSEPTIEMBRE 2000 exhibition "Composure" at Art Inc. In a discussion of "the strengths and flaws of high-tech inkjet (giclée) printing" at this exhibition, John DeFore concluded: "the most successful use of color here is in Deborah Keller-Rihn's prints, of black-and-white photos that have been hand-tinted, providing a definitive color reference for those producing the print." In 2003, she received a first place award at the Artists who Teach exhibition at the San Antonio Public Library. That year Keller-Rihn was also the lead artist in the 12th Annual Super Heroes in the Schools Art Exhibit at the Centro Cultural Aztlan, when she noted: "Super heroes traditionally... represent strength and courage, and... they're fighting for good." Keller-Rihn honored her late mother with images printed on votive candles before the Hindu goddess Tara at the Centro Cultural Aztlan in 2001.

Keller-Rihn was featured in the More than Abstinence exhibition at the Joan Grona Gallery in 2004, where she displayed digital photo-poems. In 2005, she exhibited in Revelations in the Landscape: Hidden in Middens and La Fleur du Mal, at the University of Texas at San Antonio’s Downtown Gallery, which purchased most of her exhibited photographs. The same year, Keller-Rihn had a two-person show called Ground Luminosity at Stonemetal Press. She also had a one-person show called the 21 Aspects of Tara at the San Antonio International Airport, featuring painted photographs, curated by Diana Roberts. In 2006 she was featured in a group exhibition organized by Stonemetal Press at the Taller Rueca Grafico in Mazatlan, Mexico. She also had a two person show called The 21 Aspects of Tara & Images of Universal Love at Bihl Haus Arts in San Antonio, with Tibetan artist, Rabkar Wangchuk, which featured photographs on canvas. In 2010 she was in the Go-Go Girlz to Guerrilla Girls, Feminist Art Show at Northwest Vista College. In 2010 she had a one person photo exhibition called The Many Faces of India at the Health Science Center of San Antonio, Texas. In 2014 Keller-Rihn was featured in The Exquisite Rainbow Corpse show, through The Gentileschi Aegis Gallery Association (GAGA). In 2011, she created a dozen illuminated, floating altars to commemorate deceased San Antonio artists for the annual Luminaria festival, taking what Deborah Martin calls "an opportunity to stretch beyond her usual work as a photographer and painter." As the artist noted, “It gives you a chance to do something a little experimental that you wouldn't ordinarily do,” she said. “It has to be more performance based.” She participated in the 2016 Artists Who Teach exhibition. In 2017, Keller-Rihn was featured in a faculty exhibition at Northwest Vista College, as well as in Las Mujeres de Aztlan y El Segundo de Febrero at the Centro Cultural Aztlan.

In 2018, Keller-Rihn received the $200 member prize at the San Antonio Art League Annual Juried Show. She had a solo exhibition called Glimpses of Eternity at Dock Space in San Antonio in 2023. In 2024, as part of the annual festival called FOTOSEPTIEMBRE, she had a solo show called The Evolution of a Feminine Mythology, Thirty Year Retrospective at St. Mary's University. One critic designated it one of the best shows of the year. The exhibition was reprised in a fitness studio gallery called YOGA Collective at MBS. In 2024, Keller-Rihn also created a work called Altar to Guanyin, at Celebration Circle's Annual Altar Show, at the San Antonio Art League. On Mar 12, 2025, her work was published in Art with Heart: The Collection of BioBridge Global. Dan R. Goddard cited her "surreal photographic portrait" of Tara in the collection of the South Texas Blood and Tissue Center. Keller-Rihn exhibited photo etchings in the "Printmaking From San Antonio and Beyond" show at Bihl Haus Arts in 2025.

== Educator and curator ==
In addition to teaching classes in her studio and at local colleges such as Northwest Vista, Keller-Rihn has worked as an educator and curator at the San Antonio Museum of Art, the Centro Aztlán, Bihl Haus, and Northwest Vista College, all in San Antonio. In 2006, Keller-Rihn was the project manager for El Gran Dia de los Artistas, a processional celebration hosted by the Centro Aztlán that was inspired by a festival in San Miguel de Allende in Mexico called El Dia de los Locos. She co-curated the 2013 FOTOSEPTIEMBRE exhibition Layers of Light at Northwest Vista College, as well as "Mixing it Up" in 2014. The latter was selected as one of the five not-to-miss shows of the festival. Critic Sarah Fisch called it "a one-stop crash-course in some of San Antonio's most innovative artists. One curatorial project involved curating a Day of the Dead exhibition, sponsored by the Centro Cultural Aztlan, along 2 1/2 miles of the Old Mission Trail in 2019, which has set the stage for future Day of the Dead exhibitions by that institution. It featured 30-plus exhibitions. These included conventional paintings, as well as decorated shop windows, and altars installed in the trunks of antique "low rider" automobiles.
