= Adan Hernandez (artist) =

American artist (1951–2021)

Adan Hernandez (1951–2021) was a self-taught Chicano artist based in San Antonio, known for his dark paintings, which have been called “Chicano Noir,” in reference to the Film Noir genre. He is best known for creating the paintings utilized in the film Blood In, Blood Out (1993) directed by Taylor Hackford, which depicts characters involved in gang life in Los Angeles. In the film, the San Antonio-born actor Jesse Borrego played the part of Cruz Candelaria, the film's fictional artist. Hernandez also had a small role in the film as a drug dealer named Gilbert. Borrego and Hernandez became close friends in real life. According to the Los Angeles Times, the distributor's discomfort with the subject matter led to poor box office performance, though the film "became a cult classic" through home video. Cal State L.A. hosted a Blood In, Blood Out cast reunion for the film's 30th anniversary, which coincided with the launch of a commemorative book.

Hernandez's work is in the collections of the Cheech Marin Center for Chicano Art and Culture, the Metropolitan Museum of Art, and the San Antonio Museum of Art. The sale of two works to the Metropolitan came about when curator William S. Lieberman, who visited San Antonio to see the "Splendors of Mexico" exhibition at the San Antonio Museum of Art, went to see related shows at the Jansen-Perez Gallery on April 9, 1991. A branch of the Jansen-Perez Gallery opened in L.A., and Hernandez sold a considerable amount of art to members of the Hollywood film community.

== Biography ==
Hernandez was born in Childress, Texas, to a family of migrant farm workers. He had nine brothers and sisters, and grew up in Robstown, Texas.

Hernandez said his grandfather Julian Hernandez emigrated to Texas during the Mexican Revolution, and slept in cemeteries, to avoid being murdered by the Texas Rangers, who he said would kill Mexicans “on sight.” He also said his grandfather told him that farmers would hire migrants, but would kill them rather than pay them.

Hernandez's family had worked in the fields, primarily picking cotton, until they were displaced by machines (one of which could do the work of 80 humans). That is why his immediate family moved to San Antonio when he was nine years old. As a student, Hernandez was a militant, active in the student walkouts at Edgewood High School in 1968. He was subsequently a high school drop-out. Hernandez supported civil rights movement and César Chávez’s United Farm Workers (UFW).

Immigration is an important theme in Hernandez's work. Sometimes he treats it in a comic vein, as in La Migra (Immigration) Gets Zapped by Illegal Aliens, 2001. He has also utilized it in serious fashion, as in scenes in a horror film, as in the two versions of Diez y ocho ilegales Pressure-Cook in a Boxcar (painted in 1993 and 2010, respectively).

Hernandez decided to become an artist the day he saw Jesse Treviño’s opening at the Instituto Cultural de México in 1981. He had never before imagined that it could be possible to be a Chicano artist who depicted the barrio. “It opened up my whole consciousness and changed the direction of my life,” he explained. Hernandez quit his waiter job (with the cooperation of his wife Debi), and began studying art books and taking pictures.

Hernandez briefly attended San Antonio College (SAC) around 1972, probably only for a semester. His first solo show took place in 1985 in the lobby of San Antonio's Guadalupe Cultural Arts Center theatre, where he made his first sale: Pachuco (Part B). Hernandez said he only sold three paintings in his first decade as an artist.

In 2002 Hernandez wrote a novel called Los Vryosos: A Tale from the Varrio. Hernandez exhibited the illustrations he made for the book, and he did a reading from it at Bihl Haus Arts in San Antonio in 2006.

In 2019 Hernandez created an altar for Day of the Dead.

At the time of his death, friends described Hernandez as contradictory: “as abrasive, opinionated, tough, and self-aggrandizing, but also positive, giving, spiritual, and a professed vegan who could just as easily indulge in meaty dishes.” HIs brother Armando Hernandez recalls that Adan “just did his thing his way and no one could tell him different… he even made a lot of his clothes he would sew patches into his denim jacket.”

According to Texas Public Radio (TPR), Hernandez “is considered one of the premier Chicano artists in the world.” As Borrego told TPR: “We would have discussions about the social impact of Chicano art and the artistic impact and value of art… But it was always rooted in, how does it affect my community? How does it affect my hood, my barrio?”

Hernandez was honored with a headlining installation in 2021 at Luminaria, San Antonio's annual cultural festival, where several paintings were publicly exhibited for the first time, including The Death of Juanito.

== Style ==
Lisa M. Messinger, then assistant curator at the Metropolitan Museum of Art in New York, says Hernandez made “haunting aerial scenes of San Antonio at night” since 1987. She also quoted Hernandez, who expressed “lifelong feelings of alienation and uncertainty, which still dominate the Chicano community, where most live on the fringes of the American dream.” Hernandez said that his blue palette specifically reflected alienation.

Once he had tried oil painting, Hernandez came to prefer it to fast-drying acrylics, because oil was a slow process that “let an image evolve on the canvas.” His expressionistic painting style was inspired by the Chicano artist Carlos Almaraz (whose work he knew from reproduction) and the Neo-Mexicanist artist Alejandro Colunga, whose work was exhibited in San Antonio.

Hernandez was deeply influenced by film noir, US detective movies that used the techniques pioneered by German Expressionist filmmakers that are also evident in horror films. They are dark, grim, and doom-laden. In these films, the deck is stacked against the common man. Flickering neon lights, spotlights, and deep shadows create a mood of danger and foreboding. Hernandez's dark mode of painting was triggered by an immediate family tragedy: his eighteen-month old daughter pushed through a screen and fell to the ground, fracturing her skull. His guilt resulted in insomnia, and led to the creation of dark paintings he painting at night. Hernandez frequently depicted Pachucos because he thought they were "the coolest thing to behold in fashion, manner, and speech."

It has been argued that the “beauty” of Hernandez's nocturnal urban scenes “function as bait,” as fatal attractions: “just a lure or trap to expose some sucker to the very real dangers that were hidden inside of that flashy urban world… the hapless rube could be crushed in a car wreck, shot by an unseen bullet breaking through the night, blown to smithereens by an exploding bomb.... Or one might become a homeless man, sleeping on a bed of newspapers and broken dreams, bathed all night long by flashing neon lights that herald attractions that are forever just out of reach.”

Hernandez calls Media Luna (1988) his first Chicano Noir painting. Hernandez was contracted to create about 20 paintings for Blood In, Blood Out, after the film's designer, Bruno Rubeo, who was scouting locations, saw his work at the Jansen-Pérez gallery (Sofia Pérez was responsible for bringing his work to the gallery) in San Antonio. Rubeo thought his works were already “cinematic.” He compared them to storyboards, the cartoon-like sketches used to block out the scenes in a film. Taylor Hackford, the film's director, thought Hernandez's work better captured the feel and atmosphere of Los Angeles than the artists they had scouted in LA.

The San Antonio film commission designed a billboard with an image of Hay un Rio (There is a River), one of Hernandez's paintings. Fashioned for the San Antonio Convention and Visitor's Bureau, it was displayed on Sunset Boulevard in LA in an attempt to attract film producers to San Antonio. Its text read: “San Antonio Film Noir Town.”

Hernandez's dark blue urban scenes are said to “reflect feelings of alienation and loss…. set at night” with “a city full of beauty and turmoil.” Hernandez seeks exciting visual effects. In contrast to César Martínez's Pachuco characters, Hernandez frequently depicts 1940s-styled gangster-types "engaged in violent acts." In Drive-by Asesino (1992) “the blast of the gun is reflected in the buglike lenses of his sunglasses,” lending “an alien air to the protagonist.” Furthermore, the assassin's arm is “seemingly emanating from his mouth,” forming “a deadly proboscis that speaks for the otherwise mute killer.”

In addition to Film Noir, Hernandez loved Mexican movies and posters. These included "Mexican Golden Age" black-and-white classics, as well as low budget, melodramatic masked wrestler and horror films. He sometimes included images of film posters and lobby cards in his paintings, such as Momia Azteca (Aztec Mummy), visible in La Sad Girl (2003), and several posters in They Don’t Want Me in My House (2005).

== Major Works ==
- La Media Luna, 1988, oil on canvas, 60 x 60 inches, private collection.
- Pachuco con Jumper Cables, 1990, oil on canvas, private collection.
- Hay un Rio (There is a River), 1991, oil on canvas, 36 x 49 1/2 inches, Metropolitan Museum of Art.
- The Death of Chuey (El Picudo), 1991, oil on canvas, 60 1/8 x 60 inches, private collection.
- They Don’t Want Me in My House, II, 1992, oil on canvas, 66 1/8 x 42 3/8 inches, private collection.
- The Death of Juanito, 1992, oil on canvas, 81 x 163 inches, estate of Adan Hernandez.
- La Bomba, and Drive-by Asesino (diptych), 1992, oil on canvas, Cheech Main Center for Chicano Art and Culture.
- Diez y ocho ilegales Pressure-Cook in a Boxcar, 1993, oil on canvas, private collection.
- La Migra (Immigration) Gets Zapped by Illegal Aliens, 2001, 72 x 54 inches, private collection.
- La Sad Girl, 2003, oil on canvas, collection of Cheech Marin.
- They Don’t Want Me in My House, 2005, oil on canvas, 66 x 42 inches, private collection.

== Novel ==
Hernandez, Adan. (2006). Los Vryosos: A Tale from the Varrio. 1st ed. Las Vegas, NV: StarQuest.

== Catalogs ==
- Cordova, Ruben Charles, and Joe A. Diaz. (2004). Arte Caliente!: Selections from the Joe A. Diaz Collection: The South Texas Institute for the Arts, May 7 - August 22, 2004 : National Hispanic Cultural Center, Albuquerque, New Mexico, September 17 - February 26, 2006. Corpus Christi, Tex.: South Texas Institute for the Arts.
- Cordova, Ruben Charles. (2018). The Other Side of the Alamo: Art against Myth. San Antonio: Guadalupe Cultural Arts Center. https://libmma.s3.amazonaws.com/1369074977.pdf.
- Durán, Yolanda, René H. Arceo-Frutos, and Mexican Fine Arts Center--Museum (Chicago, Ill). (1993). Art of the Other México: Sources and Meanings. Chicago, Ill.: Mexican Fine Arts Center Museum.
- Edwards, Jim, and Contemporary Art for San Antonio (Organization). (1988). Blue Star 3: [Exhibition] July 1 - August 21, 1988, Blue Star Art Space. San Antonio, Tex.: Blue Star Art Space.
- Marin, Cheech, Max Benavidez, Constance Cortez, and Terecita Romo. (2002). Chicano Visions: American Painters on the Verge. First North American edition. Boston: Little, Brown and Co.
- Marin, Cheech, Patty Habeman, Mesa Contemporary Arts, Mesa Arts Center, and Muzeo (Anaheim, Calif). (2007). Papel Chicano : Works on Paper from the Collection of Cheech Marin. First U.S. edition. Mesa, Arizona, [Los Angeles, California]: Mesa Contemporary Arts at Mesa Arts Center ; La Mano Press.
- Marin, Cheech, Patty Haberman, and Mesa Contemporary Arts. (2013). Chicanitas: Small Paintings from the Cheech Marin Collection. Edited by Melissa Richardson Banks. Second U.S. edition. [Los Angeles, CA]: CauseConnect LLC
- Marin, Cheech, Joseph B. Schenk, Deborah Fullerton Dunn, Rush Varela, Art Museum of South Texas, and Lisa Mansy Photography. (2018). Los Tejanos: Chicano Art from the Cheech Marin Collection. Edited by Melissa Richardson Banks. First U.S. edition. [Place of publication not identified]: CauseConnect.
- Morton, Merrick, and Jimmy Santiago Baca. (2024). Blood in Blood Out. Edited by Taylor Hackford. Limited edition. [United States]: Hat & Beard Press.
- Romero, Frank, Mireia Sentís, George Vargas, and Casa Encendida (Madrid, Spain). (2007). Pintores de Aztlán. Madrid: La Casa Encendida.
- Scorza, Cris, Cheech Marin, Museum of Contemporary Art, San Diego, Riverside Art Museum, Philbrook Museum of Art, and University of Wyoming Art Museum. (2016). Papel Chicano Dos: Works on Paper from the Collection of Cheech Marin. [Los Angeles, CA]: Cause Connect.

== Public Collections ==
- Centro Cultural Aztlán, San Antonio
- Cheech Marin Center for Chicano Art and Culture
- Metropolitan Museum of Art
- San Antonio Museum of Art
