= José Esquivel =

Chicano artist and activist (1935–2022)

José Esquivel (June 10, 1935 – December 12, 2022), a Chicano artist and commercial artist based in San Antonio, Texas, has been called "one of the earliest and most important Chicano artists in Texas." He is best known for his depictions of life in Chicano barrios. Esquivel also spent a lengthy period as a wildlife artist between 1973 and 1991, when he withdrew from Chicano art due to its association with radicalism. As a commercial artist, Esquivel worked primarily for City Public Service, San Antonio’s public utility company. By the time he retired in 1987, he was the supervisor of the art department. His best and most influential work was connected to the Chicano Movement, and it is included in a number of prominent collections. Esquivel was also a co-founder of the San Antonio-based Con Safo art group, which was one of the earliest and most important Chicano art groups in the country.

Two of Esquivel's obituaries described him as an "activist" who was known for his work in challenging Anglo-American stereotypes of Mexican Americans. However, Felipe Reyes, the primary organizer of the Con Safo art group, says Esquivel was “the least activist group member.” The group as a whole "always prioritized art making over political activity, thanks in part to Esquivel’s influence," and artist César Martínez says he and two associates left the group because it was insufficiently engaged with politics. Additionally, it has been argued that the claim that Esquivel challenged stereotypes stems from a misapplication of a text written by Mel Casas that does not readily apply to Esquivel or his work.

== Biography and training ==
According to his obituary, the artist was the son of José and Elvira Esquivel. He was pre-deceased by Maria Inez Esquivel, his wife of 55 years.

Esquivel attended the Technical and Vocational High School in San Antonio, where he studied with Katherine Alsup, who entered his work in many competitions. Alsup also helped Esquivel win a scholarship to the Warren Hunter School of Art in 1954, where he received his certificate in Graphics and Watercolor Painting in 1958. With the skills Esquivel learned from Hunter, he had the ability to earn a living as a commercial artist.

Esquivel won the San Antonio Fiesta Commission flag design competition held in 1966. That design is still used on flags today. In 1987, he won the competition to provide a floral backdrop design at San Fernando Cathedral for Pope John Paul II's papal visit to San Antonio.

== Career ==
=== The Con Safo Group and the Chicano Movement ===
In 1968, Esquivel was one of the six co-founders of the Con Safo art group, initially known as El Grupo or El Grupo Seis. The other original members of the San Antonio based group were Felipe Reyes (b. 1944, the principal organizer), Jesse Almazán (b. 1937 – d. 2002), José Garza (b. 1947 – d. 2021), Jesse “Chista” Cantú (b. 1935 – d. 2018), and Roberto Ríos (b. 1941). The group also used the names Los Pintores de Aztlán and Los Pintores de la Nueva Raza. In December 1971, Cantú was excluded from the group because of his activism. Mel Casas (1929-2014) and Jesse Treviño (1946-2023) joined the group at that time, and the name Con Safo was adopted.

Esquivel explains how the Chicano movement affected him: "Before the Chicano movement, we had no politicians who would stand up to the system. We basically stayed in our place. We did nothing about our condition — we accepted things as they were. Until MAYO [the Mexican American Youth Organization] under José Angel Gutiérrez led the student rebellions, we accepted the white man’s rule. . . . You know where you belong and where you don’t. I didn’t go out of the barrio very much. I hate to make this comparison, but it was like training a dog. You just wouldn’t dare go most places!

=== Chicano Art Phases ===
Many of Esquivel's most powerful Chicano works from his first Chicano art period (c. 1968-73) treat farm workers, who take on a mechanical aspect from their repetitious toil in the fields.

In his second Chicano art period, which began in 1991, Esquivel was deeply influenced by Surrealist artists and artists associated with them. (Some of the work in his first Chicano art period also reflected Surrealist sources.) These include Henri “Le Douanier” Rousseau the self-taught late 19th and early 20th century French artist, whom the Surrealists and Pablo Picasso admired. Esquivel was also influenced by Salvador Dalí, Diego Rivera, and Frida Kahlo. The latter two artists went through Surrealist phases and were also great admirers of Rousseau.

It has been argued that "Esquivel’s most important contributions to Chicano art were his paintings from the early 1970s of stylized farm workers (some of which were abstracted into virtual laboring beasts, others melded with the crops they harvested) and his allegorical variations on his parents' simple Westside home that he painted in the 2000s (they allude to poverty, and to the threats posed by crime and drugs, but these factors were countered by images of familial warmth, spirituality, and the accumulation of simple possessions that seem to offer protection and hope)."

In 1977, Esquivel's work was featured in the "Dale Gas" Chicano Art Exhibition at the Houston Contemporary Arts Museum. In 1977, the Centro Cultural Aztlan was founded in San Antonio, in part to showcase the pioneering work of early Chicano artists, though, at that time, Esquivel had quit making Chicano art for a period of several years. Esquivel's work is featured in the National Museum of Mexican Art, the McNay Art Museum in San Antonio, and the San Antonio Museum of Art (SAMA). Shortly before his death, his archives were placed at the Smithsonian Institution's Archives of American Art. Esquivel's work has been shown at various university exhibitions.

== Notable works ==
His painting Garcia’s Grocery Store, 1962 (private collection), a barrio store in the snow, featured the slogan (“Henry B. to D.C.”) that Henry B. Gonzalez used in his congressional campaign.

His ink drawing Untitled, 1967 (private collection), features a surreal tableau that mysteriously appears on a tree stump.

His mixed media work La Cruz, 1970 (20 x 30 inches, collection of the artist's estate), features a cross with rays of light and surreal elements at the top.

His watercolor Puffying Away, 1970 (20 x 23 inches, collection of the artist’s estate) is an early anti-pollution work.

His watercolor West of Town, 1970 (22 3/8 x 27 3/8 inches, San Antonio Museum of Art, gift of Mr. and Mrs. Robert Willson), is an important work of political advocacy that advances an activist slate of Chicano candidates.

His watercolor Cowboy Rhythm, 1970 (20 x 30 inches, private collection), hearkens back to the first Con Safo group exercises and exhibitions in 1968, which treated Cowboys as Americana. These forms also developed into Southwest Landscape.

His mixed media painting Farm Workers, 1971 (Santos Martinez Chicano Art Collection) is a rendering of a family of farm laborers synthesized into a fruit-bearing bush.

His watercolor Cultural Genocide, 1971 (23 x 29 inches, private collection) features a strange "creature [that] is suggested in the center, with prominent ribs. The lower body and the hind leg in the lower right suggest a quadruped, presumably a beast of burden. But the two human-looking arms that reach out in the lower left corner contradict this reading. The implication is that humans are laboring like beasts of burden."

His watercolor Southwest Landscape, 1973 or 1971 (20 x 30 inches, private collection) shows workers "so accustomed to stoop labor that they appear to be quadrupeds planted into the earth. They seem to exist in a dreamlike state, hypnotized or locked in suspended animation, perhaps awaiting a social and political awakening that will set them free. Meanwhile, embryos mature like sprouting seeds in the background hills (C/S, 2009, p. 42)."

His watercolor Abuelita, 1972 (20 x 30 inches, private collection), "could symbolize migration to the cold north."

His Con Safo Graphic, 1972, was used as the cover image for a group publication for the July, 1972 group exhibition at the Mexican American Cultural Center (MACC) at the Assumption Cultural Center in San Antonio.

His watercolor La Raza Growing Wings, 1973 (20 x 30 inches, private collection) alludes to growing Chicano consciousness.

His pencil drawing El Caballo, 1973 (20 x 30 inches, the artist’s estate), punningly has a horse metamorphose out of cigarette smoke.

His watercolor Labor Rhythms, 2001 (20 x 30 inches, private collection) revisits the forms developed in Southwest Landscape.

His painting El Caballo c/s #2, 2004 (36 x 48 inches, the artist’s estate) recreates his 1973 drawing in paint.

His painting Technoman 21st Century, 2007, shows his interest in ecology.

His painting La Tiendita, 2014, was featured in Xicanx: Dreamers + Changemakers at the Museum of Anthropology at The University of British Columbia.

His watercolor and mixed media work Golden Hand, 2016, was acquired by the City of San Antonio.

His painting Las Nubes, 2016 (30 x 40 inches, collection of the artist’s estate) features produce that helps to conceal a UFW eagle. It also features a mestizo head and a subtle image of the Virgin of Guadalupe as a farm worker.

His painting Dreamers in Space,” 2014 – 2018, depicts the ambiguous legal status of the young immigrants in the Dreamers program: they float in space, inspired by a Magritte painting.

His painting Haunted, 2022, a bleak vision of an empty house, is the last major artwork Esquivel completed.

== Personal life ==
He worked a full-time job and took freelance work as an artist to support his family.

Esquivel died at Methodist Hospital on December 12, 2022, aged 87.
