= Felipe Reyes (artist) =

Felipe Reyes (born 1944) is an American Chicano artist from San Antonio, Texas. He is best known as a painter who created political works in the late 1960s and early 1970s, and for organizing the Con Safo art group. Beginning in the mid-1970s, he also made abstract works.

== Education ==
Reyes attended Lanier High School. He took art classes at the defunct San Antonio Art Institute, then associated with the McNay Art Museum. Reyes served in the U.S. Army from 1963-1967. After passing his GED, he studied at San Antonio College. Then he attended Trinity University, where he received his B.A. degree in Art and Art History. He also has a B.F.A. degree in Communication Design. Reyes' M.F.A. degree, in Painting, Drawing, and Art History, is from the University of Michigan.

== Biography ==
Reyes was the primary founder and organizer of the Con Safo art group, said to be one of the earliest, longest-lived, and most important of the Chicano art groups. It began with six members in 1968. The other founding members were: Jose Esquivel, Jesse Almazán, Roberto Ríos, Jose Garza, and Jesse "Chista" Cantú. Originally known as El Grupo or Grupo Seis, it went through two name changes before adopting the name Con Safo in late 1971. The group became a vehicle for understanding Chicano identity, for learning how to create Chicano Art, and for developing exhibition opportunities when they were excluded from mainstream venues. The group's first exhibition took place in November 1968 at the Galerias Almázan, operated by group member Jesse Almázan.

Artist Cesar Martinez moved to San Antonio in 1971 and soon met Reyes. Martinez, who would later become a Con Safo group member, said this of Reyes: "Though we were all trying to express these new ideas that were entering our political and cultural consciousness... I would say that Felipe’s work was the most politically on target, very topical."

Reyes developed as a Chicano artist within the group. He left Con Safo permanently in December of 1973. Reyes had moved from San Antonio to attend graduate school at the University of Michigan that fall.

During his time at Michigan, Reyes, along with Santos Martinez, another San Antonio native who was a member of the Con Safo group, played a part in inspiring the Raza Art and Media Collective (RAMC). In 1974, prior to RAMC's first publication, Reyes contributed to a University of Michigan Movimiento Estudiantil Chicanx de Aztlán (MEChA) newsletter called Art and La Raza. Reyes is presently represented by the Aanna Reyes Gallery in San Antonio.

Reyes taught at the University of Michigan, then returned to San Antonio, where he taught at the University of Texas at San Antonio (UTSA) and subsequently at San Antonio College (SAC). He then taught at Harlandale High School in San Antonio until his retirement.

Reyes talked in 2009 about how Chicanos differed from Mexicans, and how Chicanos related to other historically disenfranchised groups:

"Our art viewed Chicano issues as the condition of man: we were like other disenfranchised cultures with similar circumstances and experience. We made parallels with artists from their periods who had addressed social issues in their art. Rather than accepting our marginalization, we wanted full participation in society. We wanted to give expression to our experiences with directness and honesty. Our art was a mirror which reflected our bicultural realities. Mexicans are our brothers and we love them, we are descended from them--but we are also Americans, and we had to capture the uniqueness of our situation. At first we were naive, but our political awareness became deeper and more profound."

== Art ==
=== Early Chicano art period ===
Reyes focused on Chicano art from 1968 through 1973. One of Reyes' most influential works is Sacred Conflict (1971), a painting that initiated a critique of the commonly-held symbolism associated with the Alamo, a former Spanish mission in downtown San Antonio that figured in the Texas rebellion against Mexico. In Reyes' painting, a United Farm Workers (UFW) flag flies from the Alamo church. Reyes provided his interpretation of the painting in a Chicano publication called Magazín in 1972:

“Throughout this painting is an intermingling of ironic symbols. The Alamo means different things to different peoples. To the Anglos it represents what they call oppression by Mexican tyrants. But to the Chicanos the Alamo is the symbol of Anglo aggression. The Chicano flag over it represents our viewpoint, that is, that the Alamo was a victory for us, the Chicanos. Yet the Anglos claim the whole event as their victory. In a way the Alamo is a sacred symbol. It is an event trapped in the past, it is something beyond our manipulations and therefore something beyond criticism. But the different attitudes force me to apply meaning to this symbol. To be brief, the Alamo to me represents vengeance for the Chicano, and the flag is the Chicano symbol for justice.”

The 1972 Magazín piece featured six paintings by Reyes (which are discussed here), a lithograph, and a page of the artist's commentary.

Sacred Conflict inaugurated the exhibition "The Other Side of the Alamo: Art Against the Myth," held at the Guadalupe Cultural Arts Center in San Antonio in 2018, and the painting's influence was discussed in several reviews, as well as subsequent discussions of the exhibition.

The Chicano Movement was deeply associated with and linked to the United Farm Workers, and Reyes made a number of other artworks that treated the UFW, including Southwesterly Winds (1970), whose title references the Bob Dylan lyric “You don’t need to be a weatherman to know which way the wind blows.” Reyes said that hippies were sympathetic to the Chicano movement, and he compared them to Pachucos.

Reyes also treated the UFW in other art works, including Todos Son Carnales (We Are all Brothers) (1971), Lettuce Prey (c. 1971-72), and ¡Huelga! (Strike) (1972). The Con Safo group organized an exhibition in support of the UFW that opened in Laurie Auditorium in November of 1972. Reyes wrote a response to a critique of the exhibition in the Trinity Review. It was meant to travel across the country and conclude at the UFW's national headquarters in La Paz, California, but much of the group's work was lost at the first traveling venue, in Mission, Texas in late 1972 or early 1973.

One of the artist's most provocative paintings is Instant Genocide, also known as Peace on Earth, Good Will Towards Men (c. 1971). According to an art historian who has studied Reyes' work, "This painting had an electrifying effect on everyone who saw it. The spray can’s design is a wrap-around Texas flag... 'INSTANT GENOCIDE,' the product name, is emblazoned across the blue and red fields... Directions are specified in small print: “To Be Used on Chicanos, Indians, Blacks, and all Other Undesirables."

Around 2020, Reyes discussed his rationale for the piece: "The practice of killing people of color was widespread." By utilizing an insecticide-like can, Reyes implied that people of color were regarded as subhuman pests, such as insects. He also addressed the role of the Ku Klux Klan and the Texas Rangers in violence, physical and social suppression, and what he called "cultural genocide." In 2025, Instant Genocide was illustrated and discussed in a Whitney Museum of American Art catalogue treating Chicano art in Texas.

Reyes also did cartoonish, satiric work, such as El Lambiache (the Spanish title is derived from the word for lick, so it could be translated as The Kiss-Ass, Ass-Licker, or Brown-Noser), a painting from c. 1972-73. This painting depicts a brown man wearing whiteface, with red balls at the end of his nose and on his cheek that liken him to a clown. The depicted person has a long, extended, undulating tongue that was influenced by Ed “Big Daddy” Roth's character called Ratfink. Reyes has described this character as a "sell out," a "Tio-taco" (uncle Tom), an "informant," and a "saboteur," one who scurries away when the lights are turned on (thus by implication a rat). This figure has blue eyes and is depicted against a US flag, one of whose stars has been replaced by a UFW eagle emblem. When Reyes interviewed Texas-born Chicana artist Carmen Lomas Garza in the December, 1971 issue of Magazín, he stated: "Institutions try to impose cultural imperialism on Chicanos. They try to make brown people into brown whites."

Reyes also made art works that referenced political events in the cities of Pharr and San Antonio. At Pharr in 1971, a bystander who emerged from a barber shop was shot and killed by police, who fired live rounds to disperse a demonstrating crowd. Reyes responded with a painting of a Texas flag that was bleeding from gunshot wounds, which he titled Pharr (1971).

In his 1972 painting titled Fast Buckaroo Politics, Reyes criticized San Antonio's political machine, known as the Good Government League (GGL), which dominated elections for many years. It featured a mock dollar bill, with the inscription "I BACK MAC," a reference to the machine boss Mayor McAllister, who was also a powerful banker. It featured a shield in the center like that of Superman with a large "S"--but the S was transformed into a dollar sign. It also mockingly referenced a GGL slogan: "Pave for progress," and it introduced a new slogan "In GGL we trust."

In another painting, called The Rising Star of San Juan, c. 1971-72, Reyes poked fun at GGL politician John Gatti, who became the new mayor of San Antonio. He opposed Gatti's ascendency to the rising sun of the UFW flag.

According to the Express-News in 2021, the Centro Aztlan's annual Virgin of Guadalupe exhibition was inaugurated 25 years earlier with a display of work by Reyes.

Speaking of the ambitions of Chicano artists, Reyes declared: "We created a kind of American art called Chicano art... We wanted to be honest and leave something good in the world."

=== Post Con Safo group art ===
In a September 24, 1974 letter to José Esquivel, Santos Martínez reported that Reyes had become an abstract artist while attending the University of Michigan. After Reyes returned to San Antonio, he discarded the Chicano works he had retained. In 1977 he exhibited at the San Antonio Museum of Modern Art (SAMOMA).

A May 30, 1993 article in the San Antonio Express-News, titled "Artistry vs. political activism," says the "issue of formal quality vs. political activism" is currently raging. The article's author contrasts Mel Casas and Reyes, stating Casas "is clearly a Chicano painter, while Reyes is known for a more abstract, introspective, formal style that does not feature an explicit political content."

Casas, by his own account, was reluctant to join a Chicano art group, because he thought it would be limiting. Reyes, who wanted to professionalize the group, had made several efforts before he was able to persuade Casas to join the group in late 1971, when it adopted the name Con Safo at Casas' suggestion. The author of the 1993 Express-News article does not appear to be aware of Reyes' earlier political paintings, nor of his involvement in the Con Safo group.

By 2006, if not earlier, Reyes had returned to Chicano themes and figural art in the exhibition "Barrio Dogs and the Cholo Landscape." In 2017 Reyes reported three primary subjects in his art. He made figural as well as non-figural works: "Hearts, Non-Figurative Works, & Cholos (Dogs as representations of other representations of the human condition)."

== Books and Catalogues ==
Cordova, Ruben C. (2005). "Con Safo," in Ilan Stavans, ed. in chief, and Harold Augenbraum, assoc. ed., Encyclopedia Latina: History, Culture, and Society in the United States. Danbury, Conn.: Grolier Academic Reference.

Cordova, Ruben Charles. (2009). Con Safo : The Chicano Art Group and the Politics of South Texas. Los Angeles: UCLA Chicano Studies Research Center Press.

Cordova, Ruben C. (2018). The Other Side of the Alamo: Art Against the Myth. San Antonio: Guadalupe Cultural Arts Center. ISBN 978-0-464-84184-5.

Cordova, Ruben C. (2025). “Mel Casas and Luis Jiménez: Two Chicano Trailblazers from Texas,” in Dan Nadel, Laura Phipps, Scott Rothkopf, and Elisabeth Sussman, eds., Sixties Surreal, New Haven: Yale University Press (distributed for the Whitney Museum of American Art).

Cordova, Ruben C. (2025). “The Con Safo Art Group (1968-1976), San Antonio, Texas,” in Rocio Aranda-Alvarado and Deborah Cullen-Morales, eds., A Handbook of Latinx Art, Oakland: University of California Press, Documents of Twentieth Century Art series.

Rodriguez, Patricia. (1979). Selected Readings on Chicano Art. Berkeley, CA.
