= Ramin Samandari =

Ramin Samandari is an Iranian-born photographer who has been based in San Antonio, Texas since 1988. He began studying photography in San Antonio, and worked as a photojournalist before becoming a fine arts photographer. He photographs portraits, nudes, still life, landscapes, and clouds, and is particularly interested in ethnicity.

== Life ==
Samandari's parents sent him to Odessa, Texas in 1978, when he was 17 years old in order to escape the Iranian Revolution. Martial law was declared during his senior year in high school, and he would have faced mandatory conscription the next year. Samandari effectively "went from oil country to oil country, emigrating from Iran to the Permian Basin thanks to a sponsoring relative who lived in Odessa."

The outbreak of the Iran-Iraq War ended his plans to return to Iran, and he eventually became a U.S. citizen in 1990. Samandari moved to San Antonio in 1988, and he began training as a photographer, first taking darkroom photography classes at San Antonio College (SAC). He began as a photojournalist, working for The Ranger (the SAC student newspaper), then he moved on to the San Antonio Express-News and the San Antonio Light (the latter is now defunct). His "artsy," non-conventional photography that experimented with focus was not a good fit for the photojournalism profession, so he struck out on his own.

In the early 1990s, Samandari began exhibiting his work, initially in places like theatre lobbies and restaurants in Austin and San Antonio. He has exhibited frequently since that time. Samandari survived a heart attack in 2021. In 2023 Samandari was the San Antonio Art League Museum's "Artist of the Year," partially due to his series of portraits called "San Antonio Faces of Art," which were portraits of people in the arts community.

== Exhibitions ==
In the 1990s, Samandari exhibited primarily in non-traditional venues in San Antonio and Austin. He began to have solo exhibitions in 2000. In his early works, Samandari incorporated poetry passages by Rumi, the 13th-century Persian writer. He brought back family photos from Iran in 2000, and he merged them digitally into scenes in San Antonio.

In 2005, Samandari documented "everyday life" in Iran with 100 photographs in the exhibition "Fragments of Memories: A Personal Glimpse into Modern Day Iran. It showed aspects of culture beyond the limited range of images normally seen in the west. According to Steve Rockwell, "Samandari’s intent was to, not only reconnect with his own personal history, but to allay some of the prevalent political distrust with his human narrative."

Samandari turned to Rumi again in 2007, with faint bilingual texts making commentary on his photographs. In exhibitions in 2010 and 2011, he focused on plants and clouds, and utilized passages from Charles Baudelaire’s The Flowers of Evil (1857) as inscribed commentary. Most of the clouds were taken in San Antonio.

In 2011 Samandari exhibited nudes in “Earthly Bodies” at Gallery Nord. Critic Steve Bennett noted that Samandari "continues his exploration of the human body and nature — and the human body in nature... nudes and landscapes capturing outdoor beauty around San Antonio, including Guadalupe State Park, Enchanted Rock and the Pedernales River."

In 2014, Samandari took daily self-portraits, a practice that led him to take portraits of artists in the community, which culminated in two exhibitions, San Antonio Faces of Art, and Faces of Artpace, both in 2016.

Samandari participated in the 2018 San Antonio Tricentennial exhibition called "Common Currents." Held at multiple venues, Samandari was featured in the show at Artpace.

As a consequence of the importance of the immigration issue in American politics, Samandari mounted an "ancestry-focused portrait project" at the UTSA Institute of Texan Cultures (ITC) in 2019 called Huddled Masses: Who We Are. It featured portraits of 300 people who held whiteboard placards bearing their ethnic heritage in terms of percentages. As Samandari told the San Antonio Report: “Right from the get-go during the [presidential] candidacy and post-election, there was a lot of anti-immigrant sentiment coming from the White House. I thought about doing this project to talk about the history of this country,” he said, which was “made by immigrants.” Samandari told the San Antonio Express-News that the exhibition's aim was "to show the diversity of the American public, being from a variety of places (and) descendents of immigrants.” We was "really, really surprised" by the results of this project, which revealed a far wider variety of backgrounds than he had expected. Ron Nirenberg, the city's newly elected mayor, for instance, listed many countries to which his family traced their roots, including Russia, India, Malaysia, and the Philippines.

Samandari's Faces of Islam was exhibited in the Dock Space Gallery in the Lone Star Arts District in San Antonio in 2022.

Samandari's 2023 Artist of the Year exhibition was held at the San Antonio Art League Museum.

Samandari participated in The Art of the Sacred Texas Springs Exhibition at Incarnate Word in 2024. In that year, he also exhibited his third series of nude photographs, called "Disengaged Body."

Samandari's exhibition "The Long Goodbye" in 2025 documented his mother's descent into Alzheimer's disease, with the attendant loss of memory.

=== One Person Exhibitions ===
- "Flora" - MBS Gallery. San Antonio, TX. 2024 (Contemporary Art Month exhibit)
- "Retrospective" - San Antonio Art League and Museum. San Antonio, TX. 2023
- "Faces of Islam", A microcosm of the Muslim community in San Antonio. Dock Space Gallery and Annex. San Antonio, TX. September 2022
- "Huddled Masses, Who We Are" - UTSA Institute of Texan Cultures. San Antonio, Texas. September 2019
- "Body and Mind" - Dock Space Gallery ( Lone Star Art District). San Antonio, Texas. September 2017
- "San Antonio Faces of Art" - Department of Culture and Creative Development. Plaza de Armas, San Antonio, Texas. July 2016
- "Faces of Artpace" - Artpace San Antonio. June 2016
- "Earthly Bodies" - Gallery Nord. San Antonio, Texas. September 2011 San Antonio Express News
- "Veils of Nephele" - Southwest school of Art. San Antonio, Texas. September 2010 San Antonio Express News
- "Revelations in the landscape" - University of Texas at San Antonio.Texas. September 2007*"In Search of the Beloved" - Bihl Haus Arts. San Antonio, Texas. July 2007
- "Fragments of Memories" (A personal glimpse into modern day Iran) - Blue Star Contemporary Art Center. San Antonio, Texas, 2005.
- "Sacred Landscapes" - Center for Spirituality and the Arts. San Antonio, Texas. 2004
- "Reflections of Islam" - San Antonio Museum of Art. San Antonio, Texas. 2001
- "The Immaculate Conception" - Carver Cultural Center. San Antonio, Texas. March 2000
- "Suspended Effect of a Presence" - Guadalupe Cultural Arts Center. San Antonio, Texas. September 2000

== Public Collections ==
- UTSA Institute of Texan Cultures
- San Antonio Museum of Art
- University of Texas at San Antonio
- Tobin Center for the Performing Arts

== Publications ==
- Art at our Doorstep: San Antonio Writers & Artists. Edited by Nan Cuba and Riley Robinson. (Trinity University Press, 2008). ISBN 1595340394
- Wildflower. Stone. Poetry book by Marian Haddad. (Pecan Grove Press, 2010). ISBN 1931247854
- Fotoseptiembre Internacional. 1996, 1998, 2000.

== Grants ==
- City of San Antonio Department of Arts and Culture. Individual project grant. 2022–2023
- New York Foundation for the Arts Individual grant. 2022
