= Roberto Gonzalez (artist and musician) =

Chicano artist, curator, and musician

Roberto Gonzalez (born 1955) is a Chicano artist, curator, and musician. He was a member of the San Antonio-based Con Safo art group in the mid-1970s. As an artist, he has exhibited locally, nationally, and internationally. Gonzalez worked primarily as an abstract artist from the 1970s until the early 2000s, after which time he emphasized pre-Columbian imagery in an effort to engage with his ancestors. He has also worked as a performance artist since 1974. Gonzalez has curated numerous exhibitions, notably at the Carver Cultural Center in San Antonio, where he served as the Fine Arts Administrator (1984-1995). Gonzalez is also a percussion musician who specializes in Pre-Hispanic and African Diaspora music. He has trained with several African Diaspora music masters and has been active in several musical groups.

== Biography ==
Born in Laredo, Texas to parents from Coahuila, Mexico, Gonzalez moved to San Antonio at the age of eleven. During his early college years, his professor Mel Casas, at San Antonio College (SAC), invited him to join the Con Safo group. Gonzalez received a B.A. in Painting from Trinity University in San Antonio in 1978. In 1980, he earned a B.B.A. from the University of the Incarnate Word. Gonzalez has been a painter since 1973. In 1974, he began making Performance Art works, making him one of the first Chicano Performance Artists. He has worked as an Arts Administrator/Curator and educator since 1982. Gonzalez worked as a Presenter, in Public Relations, Education Outreach, and Programming. He also has curated over 200 exhibitions at the Carver Cultural Center and other arts spaces in San Antonio. Also, Gonzalez worked for over a decade as an Artist in Residence for many of the San Antonio School Districts. He has been a Musician and recording artist since 1989. He currently is Co-Artistic Director of Son Olividados. He has five music CD's available under the musician name "Xivero" which can be heard on iTunes and other music services.

== Exhibitions ==
=== Group exhibitions ===
==== The Con Safo group period ====
Gonzalez joined the Con Safo art group by April, 1974, and he was active in the group until it came to an end in 1976. In San Antonio, he participated in Con Safo exhibitions at: Assumption Seminary (1974), Saint Mary’s University (1975), the Institute of Texan Cultures (1975). He was also part of the following Con Safo exhibitions outside of San Antonio: North Texas State, Denton (1974), the University of Oklahoma, Norman (1974), Crystal City High School (1975), College of the Mainland, Texas City (1975).

==== Major Group Exhibitions ====
Gonzalez's work has been featured in numerous group exhibitions in Texas as well as the following: The Polyforum Siqueiros, Mexico City (1982), El Museo del Barrio, New York City (1984), the Plaza de la Raza, Los Angeles (1984), the Museo Carrillo Gil, Mexico City (1990), and the University of British Columbia Museum of Anthropology, Vancouver, Canada (2022).

==== Selected Group Exhibitions 1974 - present ====
- "Con / Safo" Chicano Literature Symposium University of Oklahoma (1974)
- "The Expo de San Antonio en Mexico" Polyforum Siquieros Mexico City (1982)
- "The Canadian Club Hispanic Art Tour" El Museo del Barrio, New York City (1984) Plaza de la Raza, Los Angeles (1984) San Antonio Museum of Art (1984)
- “Influences" San Antonio Museum of Art (1987)
- “Tejanos” Instituto Nacional de Bellas Artes Museo Carrillo Gil MX, D.F. (1990)
- "Blue Star 8th Annual Artist Exhibition" Blue Star Contemporary July (1993)
- "The Other Side of the Alamo" Centro de Artes (2018)
- "The Day of the Dead in Art" Centro de Artes (2019)
- "Xicanx: Dreamers + Changemakers) Museum of Anthropology at University of British Colombia 2022-2023

=== Solo Exhibitions in San Antonio ===
- Trinity University (1977)
- "One Man Exhibition" The Carver Cultural Center (1978-1979)
- "Solo Exhibition" The San Antonio Museum of Modern Art (1979)
- Luna Notte Gallery (1996)
- "ATL" The Carver Cultural Center (2013)
- Salon Sanchez (2014)
- "Roberto Jose Gonzalez: Sacred Waters," TAMUSA, Centro de Artes (2016)
- "One Man Exhibition," Hispanic Heritage Month," St. Philips College (2016)

== Artistic style ==
The artist has committed his approach to creating his paintings with the necessity to continually change, mix, fuse, and counterpoint. Throughout his career as a painter he has worked in the mediums of Acrylic, Oil and Watercolor. The artist developed a "decal" transfer process in which he paints on plastic, and, after the paint has dried, he transfers it onto the canvas with a layer of gel he puts on the canvas. While the plastic is still affixed to the canvas, Gonzalez then cuts linear channels into it, through which he sprays gold or silver-colored paint to create outlines. This process is discussed in connection with the painting "Ollin" in "Glasstire," which includes a process shot.

Gonzalez also sometimes works in a more conventional manner by drawing or painting directly on a black canvas, in his "Dreamstack" series.

== Selected works ==
- “Esid,” 1979, acrylic on canvas, 88 x 67 inches.
- "Nove," 1984, acrylic on canvas, 70 x 30 inches.
- Untitled, 1986, acrylic on canvas, 72 x 70 inches.
- "Hotel Nueva Nova," 1990, mixed media on paper, 36 x 24 inches.
- “Rau,” 2010, acrylic on canvas, 90 x 78 inches.
- “Kociyo,” 2014, acrylic on canvas, 80 x 64 inches.
- “Cocijo,” 2014, acrylic on canvas, 134 x 70 inches.
- “Ollin” 2016, acrylic on canvas, 10 x 16 feet.
- "Una Limpia de Colón: Eres un Conquistador" (A Columbus/colon Cleansing: You are a Conquistador), 2018, acrylic with gold and silver leaf on canvas, 90 x 78 inches.
- "El Paso 8/3/19, No Hate, No Fear" (diptych), 2019, acrylic on canvas, 40 x 96 inches (each panel). This diptych has been discussed in several publications in Canada, Mexico, and the U.S.
- "DreamStack Series: Adicto Al Peligros" (Addicted to Danger), 2019, acrylic on canvas, 96 x 40 inches. Gonzalez' inscription “Alta Souciedad” (high trash) is an insulting transformation of the phrase “alta sociadad” (high society).

== Awards ==
- Indonesian Government's Pemerintah Propinsi Daerah Tingkat I Jawa Barat Award (1986)
- Texas Commission on the Arts Artist in Residence (1998-2002)
- Urban-15 Artist in Residence (2002-2003)
- The San Antonio Department for Culture and Creative Development's “Creative of the Month,” June, 2016
