= XBiotech =

American biopharmaceutical company

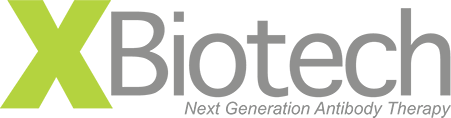
- Type: Public
- Traded as: Nasdaq: XBIT
- Industry: Biopharmaceutical
- Founded: 2005 in Canada
- Founder: John Simard
- Headquarters: Austin, Texas, United States
- Area served: Worldwide
- Key people: John Simard (Chairman) Sushma Shivaswamy (Interim CEO)
- Website: xbiotech.com

XBiotech Inc. is a clinical-stage biopharmaceutical company based in Austin, Texas. It specializes in the research and development of human-derived antibody therapeutics for multiple diseases, including cancer, rheumatological, and infectious diseases.

== History ==
XBiotech was founded in 2005 in Vancouver, Canada by John Simard. The company moved its headquarters to Austin, Texas in 2008.

In September 2016, XBiotech was listed on Nasdaq, raising $70.9 million through its initial public offering (IPO). The company allocated about $42 million of the proceeds to complete later-stage trials for one of its key cancer drugs and to construct a new manufacturing and research facility in southeast Austin. The remaining funds were used for earlier-stage trials of other products and general corporate purposes. In March 2017, XBiotech announced a registered direct offering in which it sold over $30 million of its common shares at a price of $13 per share. In the same year, XBiotech opened a 40,000-square-foot production facility in Southeast Austin.

In October 2017, XBiotech enrolled its first patient in a clinical study to evaluate the effectiveness of its antibody MABp1 in combination with ONIVYDE and 5-fluorouracil/folinic acid for treating pancreatic cancer.

In December 2019, XBiotech's drug for dermatological conditions, bermekimab, was acquired by Janssen Pharmaceutical, a subsidiary of Johnson & Johnson, for $750 million. XBiotech is eligible for up to $600 million in milestone payments, potentially increasing the total value of the deal to $1.35 billion. In February 2022, Johnson & Johnson discontinued development of bermekimab for eczema taking a $610 million pretax impairment charge. As of January 2023, bermekimab is no longer being developed for hidradenitis suppurativa.

During the COVID-19 pandemic, XBiotech worked with BioBridge Global to offer its antibody screening technology to the South Texas Blood & Tissue Center. The technology identified patients with natural antibodies effective against the virus. XBiotech also developed a COVID-19 therapy candidate by isolating specific antibodies and their genes from convalescent plasma, aiming to create a mass-producible, purified antibody product.

== Xilonix ==
XBiotech is known for developing Xilonix, a candidate therapeutic for treating advanced colorectal cancer by targeting tumor-associated inflammation, an approach intended to inhibit both tumor growth and metastasis.

Xilonix received fast-track designation from the United States Food and Drug Administration in 2012 and had progressed to Phase 3 trials in both the United States and Europe by 2016. In February 2017, XBiotech reported in an SEC filing that it had received an extension from European regulators to address deficiencies the agency was asserting in the registration application. The company indicated it expected to meet the new deadline of March 22 to respond to these issues.
