= Jesse Treviño =

Mexican American artist (1946–2023)

Jesus Treviño (December 24, 1946 – February 13, 2023), better known as Jesse Treviño, was a Mexican-born American visual artist. He essentially became a Chicano artist after he was wounded in Vietnam during the Vietnam War, which required him to learn how to paint with his left hand. Based in San Antonio, Texas, his paintings and murals largely depict the Mexican American/Chicano community of San Antonio, including cinemas and neighborhood shops, as well as people. He is best known for his photorealist paintings from the late 1970s and early 1980s, and for his large-scale mosaic murals made out of ceramic tiles, which he produced later in his career.

According to Ruben C. Cordova, curator of his 2009 retrospective at the Museo Alameda, he was beloved as well as famous within San Antonio: "Jesse Treviño was far and away the most famous artist San Antonio ever produced. His renown greatly transcended the art world: he was the hometown hero par excellence. At the same time, Treviño was an important role model for Chicano artists, from the self-taught artist Adan Hernandez (who quit his day job when he saw Treviño's paintings) to RISD alumnus [and now MacArthur fellow] Vincent Valdez (who kept a scrapbook of articles about Treviño when he was a child)." In 2016, restaurateur Jorge Cortez declared: "San Antonio and Treviño are synonymous."

His paintings are in the collections of: the Smithsonian American Art Museum, which has two paintings (Mis Hermanos, 1976 and Tienda de Elizondo, 1993); the San Antonio Museum of Art, which has two paintings (El Alameda, 1980 and Señora Dolores Treviño, 1982); the Lyndon Baines Johnson Library and Museum, which owns the artist's youthful portrait of President Johnson; "In 1987, he presented a painting of the Alamo to President Ronald Reagan in the Oval Office," which is now in the Ronald Reagan Presidential LIbrary and Museum; one of Treviño's artworks is also in the George F. W. Bush Presidential Library and Museum.

== Biography ==
Jesus Treviño was born on December 24, 1946, in Monterrey, Mexico, to Juan Treviño and Dolores Campos. He was their ninth child. His father was born in Sabinas Hidalgo in 1906, and migrated to San Antonio for work. Dolores was born in 1915, and grew up in New Braunfels. The two met in New Braunfels when Juan was visiting his brothers who lived in that city. The two were married in New Braunfels and lived there until economic pressures and racial tensions compelled the family to undertaken a reverse migration to Monterrey, Mexico. Juan worked as a trucker for construction materials until economic pressures again compelled the family to migrate to the United States, this time to San Antonio, Texas, where the family settled in the West Side neighborhood. This neighborhood had a significant Mexican American population.

Treviño attended and won his first art award from the Witte Museum when he was six years old. He attended Fox Tech High School where a teacher named Katherine Alsup helped him obtain a scholarship in 1965 to study in New York City at the Art Student's League. In 1966, Treviño was drafted into the military to serve in the Vietnam War. He had the opportunity to return to Mexico as a Mexican national, thus avoiding military service, but he chose to enlist and gain U.S. citizenship. Several of his brothers had served in the military, and Treviño would uphold this tradition. He served in the B Co., 39th Infantry, 9th Infantry Division and trained at Fort Riley. He was deployed to Vietnam in December 1966. On February 23, 1967, he was seriously injured while crossing a rice paddy by sniper fire and a booby trap. His femur was shattered and an artery was severed by a sniper's bullet, and the explosion left him with ten shrapnel wounds due to being thrown twenty to thirty feet. As he lay injured, he began to think about what was important in his life; he vowed that if he lived, he would return home to San Antonio and paint his family and community.

"I landed face-down in a rice paddy", Treviño recalled. "My broken right leg was folded over my left leg and my right arm felt like it was on fire. The pain was so great I thought I would die. I remembered all the paintings I had made in my life, and I realized I had just painted whatever my teachers told me to paint. I thought, 'What would I paint if I lived?' I realized I had never painted my mother or my brothers. ... It made me want to survive to be able to paint the things that mattered most to me."

"Immobilized in mud and a pool of his own blood", Treviño expected to die. He was swiftly rescued by a medic and evacuated by helicopter.

Treviño was treated at a military hospital in Japan before being moved to Fort Sam Houston. Treviño's recovery was lengthy, and he would not be able to walk for a year. His right arm, his dominant hand, would eventually be amputated in late 1970. Armando Albarran, a fellow veteran who had both of his legs amputated due to war wounds, encouraged Treviño to paint with his left hand. A portrait of Albarran was the first painting Treviño completed with his left hand.

After leaving the hospital, Treviño enrolled at San Antonio College, where he would earn an Associate Degree in Art in 1970. Particularly under Mel Casas' tutelage, Treviño quickly trained his left hand, first by making highly experimental works in 1969. He soon realized that he could become a fine artist, and not merely a children's art teacher.

Treviño earned a BA in Art from Our lady of the Lake University in 1974, where he studied with Sisters Tharsilla Fuchs and Ethel Marie Corne. He received his MFA from the University of Texas at San Antonio in 1978, where he studied with Leonard Lehrer and Kazuya Sakai.

In December 1970, Treviño made the decision to have his right arm amputated to reduce nerve pain. He would continue to experience phantom nerve pain following the amputation. In December 1971, he joined the Con Safo art group. Members of this group included prominent San Antonio artists Felipe Reyes (the principal founder and a close friend) and Mel Casas, Treviño's former teacher at SAC, who joined the group at the same time. Treviño referred to the group as "a magic circle" in a 1994 newspaper article.

Before he developed his photorealist style, Treviño painted two iconic murals: Mi Vida (197–72) a biographically surreal painting done on his bedroom wall, and La Historia Chicana (1972–74), a 100-foot wrap-around mural done at Our Lady of the Lake. The latter shows development in the direction of photorealism.

In the latter part of the 1970s, Treviño developed his technique, eventually perfecting a photorealist style in 1976–77. Treviño became famous for his outdoor tile mosaics that depicted the Chicano community, culture, and history, as well as the city's Mexican heritage. Over the years he has gained prominence as one of San Antonio's most famous artists, with his mosaic murals serving as virtual landmarks in San Antonio's cultural landscape.

The artist's friendship with George (also known as Jorge) Cortez sustained him through his depressive states. Cortez sent a driver for him every morning, and he gave Treviño a table at his restaurant in Market Square called Mi Tierra, where Treviño held court.

Treviño underwent treatment for cancer in 2021. He died on February 13, 2023, at the age of 76. San Antonio Mayor Ron Nirenberg tweeted: "Jesse Treviño was an American hero. The wounds of the Vietnam war, which took so many of his friends and neighbors from the Westside of San Antonio, never left him, but he used those scars to bring healing to millions of people."

At the time of his death, Treviño still had many major projects that were unfulfilled. As his friend, collector, and advertising executive Lionel Sosa noted: "His 'to-do' list of projects was long. Treviño had a favorite gesture: he would stretch his arms upward and wide, looking much like Jesus Christ. Holding that gesture, he’d look up at the blank wall where he imagined his next mural would live. The design was already in his head. All he needed was the funding."

== Art style ==
While studying in New York at the Art Student's League, where Treviño first worked with a live model, his portraits were made in a painterly technique, in emulation of his teacher, the eminent portraitist William F. Draper. He learned to paint with shadows and color, instead of outlines. At SAC, some of his Pop-inspired works were made on shaped surfaces or made to be viewed in non-flat configurations, including Alamo Exit. TIAC (Pontiac), 1969, included the outer grill of a Pontiac GTO to fulfill a course assignment of integrating a real-world item into an art piece. Zapata, 1969, was painted for a Mel Casas assignment that required the depiction of a hero (Mexican revolutionary Emiliano Zapata), an anti-hero (food stamps), and villain (Spiro Agnew) in a single piece.

While he was painting the 36-by-48-inch Los Camaradas del Barrio (1976), the artist came to the realization that his paintings had to be even larger to achieve the effects he wanted. He perfected his photrealist style in the following works: La Raspa (1976), Mis Hermanos (1976), @Body and Fender (1977), Progresso (1977), La Troca En La Calle Commerce (1979), El Alameda (1980), and Señora Dolores Treviño (1982).

Curator Ruben Cordova explains why the photorealist style, which is so arduous to master, appealed to Treviño: "I think initially he was driven to capture something very specific about his neighborhood and his family and his people, and I think in part that's why he did a photo-realist style", Cordova said. "He said he wanted to make work that was intelligible, that everybody could understand, that was universal. And, if he had [a] kind of painterly style, maybe not everybody could understand what he was doing."

While Treviño studied with photorealist professors, and he utilized the standard, photograph-based practices, the rationale for the subjects he depicted was a departure from photorealist norms. The buildings depicted by mainstream photorealists "were not chosen because they were unique, nor because they were somehow central to the life of the city in a distinct manner. Treviño, on the other hand, sought out the most culturally significant buildings, many of which he deemed particularly beautiful. These buildings were important to him and to his friends, family, and ethnic group, especially the Spanish language theaters. If anything, Trevino picked his buildings even more carefully than his human subjects." When he painted a shop window, for instance, it was full of religious statues, and the window reflected several of San Antonio's most famous and highly regarded buildings.

Treviño evolved beyond his photorealist style, which involved replicating a master photograph in paint. His Main Library Mural of 1995 features "visual elements [that] are pieced together out of numerous photographic sources that never existed together in time and space", therefore, it "has more in common with the collage-like Mi Vida than with Treviño's smaller, seamlessly painted photorealist paintings". The Spirit of Healing, his 93-ft. high mosaic mural (1995–97) features 70 different colors of tile, but "the scale and the medium of this work necessitated substantially different effects than the detailed verisimilitude of Treviño's photorealist paintings".

== Major works ==
Treviño's first mural-sized work was Mi Vida, 1971–72, painted on the bedroom wall of his home at West Mistletoe Avenue, San Antonio. It depicted the after-effects of the artist's service in Vietnam, caused by his near-fatal wounds. The mural's central element is the face of a beautiful young woman, partially obscured by a monumental rendition of Treviño's prosthetic limb from which his Purple Heart medal is suspended. On the right, a young soldier is painted in black-and-white. A Ford Mustang, bought with the artist's disability pay, is on the left. The beer, cigarettes, and the pain-killer at the top of the painting are substances he used to combat excruciating pain. Treviño has called this work "probably one of the most important pieces ... [out of] all of the pieces I've ever done". "I remember that as almost the beginning of my whole career", he told Elda Silva in 2009.

After removal from the house, Mi Vida was first exhibited publicly at the Museo Alameda in San Antonio in the retrospective Jesse Treviño: Mi Vida in 2009–10. "Pop Art meets Surrealism," wrote curator Ruben C. Cordova in the curatorial statement printed in the brochure. At the time of the retrospective, Elaine Ayala said it was a painting "that many had heard of but few had seen". Mi Vida was subsequently exhibited at the Henry B. Gonzalez Convention Center in San Antonio in 2019. Mi Vida was featured in the Smithsonian American Art Museum's exhibit Artists Respond: American Art and the Vietnam War, 1965–1975 in 2019–2020, which traveled to the Minneapolis Institute of Art after it was seen in Washington DC. Melissa Ho, curator of the Smithsonian exhibition, noted: "Trevino's haunting, hallucinatory work anchored the final gallery of the show, stopping visitors in their tracks." In 2019, Holland Cotter described the painting as "a kind of time capsule self-portrait set in dreamtime." Mi Vida was illustrated in a Whitney Museum catalogue in 2025 in the context of 1960s Surrealism, where Cordova described it as a "haunting, phantasmatic painting" .

Mi Vida will be on view at San Antonio's main library for two years, commencing April 1, 2023. It was the third large-scale work by the artist on view at main library, joining Main Library Mural of 1995 and Mexicano, Chicano, Americano (1982 - 2007). Mi Vida was vandalized at the library in 2025, when the electrical outlet cover that was part of the original bedroom wall was removed by an unknown person.

Cordova notes how quickly Treviño mastered a new kind of painting with his left hand: "what's most amazing to me is how strong his works were immediately after losing his arm. ... I would just assume that he'd need a long time to retrain. But it's just like he reloaded and came right out and painted better than ever."

As he was finishing Mi Vida, Treviño painted another important work called La Fe (1972). This hand picking oranges (which has a tattoo of a cross) refers to the United Farm Workers and the Chicano movement. Treviño said both paintings were "done in the spirit of Con Safo".

La Historia Chicana (1972–74), painted on the invitation of Our Lady of the Lake University's Mexican-American Student Association, was done in the recreation room. "I started with the Aztecas and Conquistadores", Treviño recalled. "I put a Mexican revolutionary in the center of the next panel. He is dying with his arms outstretched, like a Christ figure." He also depicted migrants that became farm workers, as well as a Virgin of Guadalupe as a divine protectress. Treviño painted a large United Farm Workers flag. A depiction of the campus is next to pre-Columbian imagery at the beginning of the narrative, which implies continuity to the present day.

La Raspa, which depicts a vendor of flavored ices, is one of the famous photorealist paintings Treviño made in 1976. Other highly admired photorealist paintings are Progresso (1977), El Alameda (1980), and Señora Dolores Treviño (1982).

@Body and Fender (1977) "is perhaps Treviño's most unusual painting". Featuring a female nude, a self portrait, and men working in an auto body shop, it was made to be seen from all four sides.

Restaurateur Jorge Cortez is deeply impressed by what he calls "Treviño's portraits of buildings", especially El Alameda (1980), one of San Antonio's most historic theaters. El Alameda joined the collection of the San Antonio Museum of Art in 2024.

Treviño liked film, and he included signage from six important cinemas in his Main Library Mural of 1995, which is set during World War II. "I remembered the Christmas lights and the decorations I saw as a kid", Treviño explained. "I wanted it to be festive, and I wanted it to look like an altar. So I included a statue of San Antonio (St. Anthony) and candles and lights and pictures of people like General McDermott, Cleto Rodríguez, a Congressional Medal of Honor recipient, and Emma Tenayuca, the labor organizer."

The Spirit of Healing, the mosaic tile mural that Treviño completed in 1997, was made for the Christus Santa Rosa Hospital (now The Children's Hospital) of San Antonio. It is the largest tile mural in the United States, at 93 feet high and 43 feet wide. The mural was created with German tile known for its resilience and durability. More than 150,000 pieces of ceramic tile were used for the mural. Treviño's son served as a model for the child in the mural. Since it is visible at a confluence of highways, The Spirit of Healing is his best known public artwork.

In 1997-98, Treviño created La Curandera, a mural at the University Health System Texas Diabetes Center. Here Treviño references folk healing traditions, as represented by the Casa Mireles botánica and its proprietress, who supplied herbal remedies.

La Veladora is a three-dimensional mosaic mural made for the Guadalupe Cultural Arts Center in 2001-03. In this piece, Treviño "monumentalized a Virgin of Guadalupe votive candle, which projects from the 40-foot high building like a miraculous apparition". Our Lady of Guadalupe is a popular image on prayer candles, and they are prominent in Mexican American and Chicano households, as well as Catholic churches. On the 20th anniversary of the art piece, the San Antonio Express-News published quotes made by Treviño at the time of its unveiling in 2003: “When you talk about culture, I think about the Virgen de Guadalupe... I remember seeing my mom lighting up a candle, my friends lighting up a candle to the Virgen de Guadalupe.”

According to the artist, the site was a dark and dangerous corner before he created his Veladora, which he says "made it a safer place by putting this icon there". Treviño restored La Veladora in 2019. La Veladora is based on La Veladora, a painted construction made in 1999.

The Chapa Lions (2003) is a mosaic mural found on the side of a downtown Goodwill San Antonio location, on Santa Rosa Street, facing Market Square. It depicts Treviño and several workers hanging a frame around a tile image of a pride of lions, an homage to a lion mural that once stood on an adjacent building.

Treviño's unconventional portrait of labor leader César Chávez, which pictures him in the manner of a Mexican movie poster, was painted in 2006.

That same year, Treviño made a large portrait of Rosita Fernandez, known as "San Antonio's First Lady of Song". The dark background features the River Walk decorated with Christmas lights. The style and imagery has much in common with the Central Library Mural.

Mexicano, Chicano, Americano (1982 - 2007) is autobiographical. Three large self-portraits bear images of his heritage and personal history. The Virgin of Guadalupe symbolizes his Mexican origin; his choice to become a Chicano is represented by the United Farm Workers eagle; he acquired American citizenship through service in Vietnam, represented by the Purple Heart that was awarded to him.

Earl Abel's, painted in 2008, memorializes a beautiful diner that had been demolished in 2006.

A selection of the artist's work was published in the San Antonio Express-News in 2023.

Works by Treviño can be viewed online at the Smithsonian American Art Museum website, the San Antonio Museum of Art, and the UTSA Libraries Art Collection website.

== Exhibitions ==
Treviño had six solo exhibitions at the following institutions from 1981–2009:

The Instituto Cultural de México, San Antonio, 1981;

The Instituto Cultural de México, San Antonio, 1993;

The Smithsonian American Art Museum, Washington D.C., 1994–95. This exhibition included nine paintings and drawings;

The San Antonio Museum of Art, San Antonio, 1995;

The Art Museum of South Texas, Corpus Christi, 1996;

The Museo Alameda, San Antonio, 2009–10. According to the curator's statement, Jesse Treviño: Mi Vida was the artist's "first comprehensive retrospective", with "drawings, paintings, sketches for public commissions, artifacts, documents, and a mural... exhibited together for the first time". Reporter Elaine Ayala said of this exhibition: "Those acquainted with Jesse Trevino's work might find it surprising that this seminal Chicano artist just got his first comprehensive retrospective. "Jesse Trevino: Mi Vida" ... is thus the first full look at the artist's work from beginning to now." Guillermo Nicolas, president of the Alameda National Center for Latino Arts, declared: "This is a stellar curatorial undertaking showcasing the work of one of America's most important Latino artists." It was deemed one of the year's ten best exhibitions by the San Antonio Express-News: "Treviño may be San Antonio's best-known artist, but curator Ruben C. Cordova's exhaustively researched retrospective showed us there was still plenty to learn about the painter and muralist."

== Resources ==
An oral history with Jesse Treviño (2004) by the Archives of American Art (AAA), Smithsonian Institution, is available online. Spirit: The Life and Art of Jesse Treviño, a biography of Jesse Treviño by Anthony Head, with a foreword by Henry Cisneros, was published in 2019. In 2020, the AAA made a video that is available on YouTube.
