= Kathy Vargas =

American artist (born 1950)

Kathy Vargas (born June 23, 1950) is an American artist who creates photographs from multiple exposures that she hand colors. She often devotes several works to a particular theme, creating series.

== Biography ==
Vargas was born in San Antonio, Texas. She was influenced early on by her Catholic faith, her grandmother's ghost stories and her father's retelling of pre-Columbian history.

Vargas has a BFA from the University of Texas at San Antonio in 1981 and in 1984 received her MFA.

Kathy Vargas worked for many years as the Visual Arts Director of the Guadalupe Cultural Arts Center in San Antonio. She currently teaches in the art department at The University of the Incarnate Word in San Antonio, TX. She has lectured throughout the United States and Mexico.

Vargas was a recipient of the Lifetime Achievement Award in the Visual Arts from the Art League Houston in 2024. Her citation read: "Kathy Vargas boasts a multifaceted career as an artist, director, curator, educator, and mentor. Her artistic influence extends beyond San Antonio, with acclaimed retrospectives and inclusion in groundbreaking exhibitions like 'Chicano Art: Resistance and Affirmation.' From leading the Visual Arts department at Guadalupe Cultural Arts Center from 1985-2000 to chairing the University of the Incarnate Word's art department where she is currently a professor, Vargas' unwavering dedication to amplifying underrepresented voices has solidified her place as a leading figure in the art world.”

== Themes ==
Vargas uses themes of identity, spirituality, and cultural heritage in her art, often drawing on personal and cultural experiences. Her art also includes themes related to family, gender, and the relationship between personal and collective history.

== Art ==
Kathy Vargas became interested in hand-colored photography around 1970 when she worked for Bill and Jerry Hayes in her hometown at a small production company. She was placed in the animation department and from there learned how to do special effects. Vargas learned dark room work there before she began learning about photography.

At the Southwest Craft Center, Kathy learned rock-and-roll photography from Tom Wright in 1971, which she practiced professionally from 1973 to 1977.

Kathy Vargas began classes at San Antonio College with Mel Casas, a Chicano artist, who invited her to attend a Con Safo art group meeting after seeing some of her photographs. She felt welcome there and loved what the group was doing with art. Kathy gives credit to Casas for opening her eyes and sharing many Chicano and Chicana artists with her. When she began to feel limited, she notified them that it was time for her to create her own art and departed from the Con Safo art group. Vargas wanted to experiment with the medium and create her own photographic style. Vargas joined the group in 1974 and left in 1975.

A few years later, while working on a documentary project about yard shrines in her home town of San Antonio, Texas, she began researching Mexican and pre-Columbian myths and literature, and to produce works based on a photographic 'magic realism' involving layering by multiple exposure and hand colouring (Marshall).

According to the Art League Houston, "around 1980, her work began to change... she felt she needed to say some things that were more personal than documentation allowed."

In 1993 she produced a portfolio titled, Revelaciones, and a year later was published in Nueva Luz photographic journal, volume 4#2 (En Foco, Bronx: 1994)

One of Vargas's most famous series, "My Alamo," dates from 1995, created for a photography exhibition at the Mexican Museum in San Francisco. Vargas had a complex connection to the Alamo. Her great, great grandfather, Juan Vargas, was impressed by the Mexican army, but, due to his indigenous heritage, was given a broom instead of a gun. In the series, the artist also addresses her changing attitudes towards Davy Crockett and the traditional Alamo narrative. The series references unofficial narratives, such as the satiric film ¡Viva Max!, in which a rogue Mexican general recaptures the Alamo to impress his girlfriend, as well as rock star Ozzy Osborn's urinating incident on the Alamo grounds (which required a monetary "donation" to an Alamo entity before he could perform in San Antonio again).

Her Este Recuerdo series (2003) consists of 23 photographs. They are made from between two and four negatives (many shot from old family photographs) and colored with oil paint. According to the artist, her various acts of reframing result in "symbolically entombed" subjects. Vargas utilizes acidic rose and purple colors to reference early color photographs, as well as vintage hand-tinted pictures. As continuing explorations of "death and remembrance," they are intended to be melancholic relics. Vargas believes that Roland Barthes defined the essence of photography in his book Camera Lucida, written after the death of his mother. Barthes says photography is an entrance "into flat Death." Moreover, "the only thought I can have is that at the end of this first death, my own death is inscribed: between the two, nothing more than waiting...."

She is interested in "the anatomy of death and the aftermath of everlasting life." Vargas often uses iconography from Aztec art, along with various other cultural and Christian symbols.

== Notable collections ==
Kathy Vargas's work is held in the collections of several museums and cultural institutions in the United States and Mexico. Notable holdings include the Smithsonian American Art Museum in Washington D.C., the Amon Carter Museum of America in Fort Worth, Texas, the Museum of Fine Arts, Houston, the Toledo Museum of Art in Toledo, Ohio, and Centro de la Imagen located in Mexico City. Joe Diaz owns a large collection of Vargas' work.

Vargas' papers are at the at the Smithsonian’s Archives of American Art in Washington D.C.

== Exhibits ==
Solo exhibits:

- Sala Uno in Rome
- Galeria San Martín in Mexico City
- Centro Recoleta in Buenos Aires, Argentina
- McNay Art Museum in San Antonio, Texas
- Universitat Erlangen in Germany
- Light Needs Shadow Needs Light…, Art League Houston

Group exhibits:

- “Hospice: A Photographic Inquiry,” a traveling exhibit commissioned by the Corcoran Gallery, Washington D.C.
- “Chicano Art: Resistance and Affirmation (CARA).”
- ¡Arte Caliente! Selections from the Joe A. Diaz Collection.
- "Visibilities: Intrepid Women of Artpace" at Artpace, San Antonio, TX.

== Books ==
- Vargas, Kathy, and Connie Arismendi. Intimate lives: work by ten contemporary Latina artists. Austin, TX: Women & Their Work, 1993.
- Muñoz, Celia Alvarez, Noriega, Chon A., José Piedra, Kathy Vargas, and Victor Zamudio-Taylor. Revelaciones = Revelations: Hispanic art of evanescence. Ithaca, NY: Hispanic American Studies Program, Cornell University, 1993.
- Goldberg, Jim, Nan Goldin, Sally Mann, Jack Radcliffe, and Kathy Vargas. Hospice: a photographic inquiry. Boston: Little, Brown, in association with the Corcoran Gallery of Art and National Hospice Foundation, 1996. ISBN 0-8212-2259-7.
- Lippard, Lucy R., and MaLin Wilson-Powell. Kathy Vargas: photographs, 1971–2000. San Antonio, TX: Marion Koogler McNay Art Museum, 2000. ISBN 0-916677-45-1.
- Art at Our Doorstep: San Antonio Writers and Artists. Edited by Nan Cuba and Riley Robinson (Trinity University Press, 2008).
- Lippard, Lucy. (2024). Kathy Vargas: Light Needs Shadow Needs Light… Houston: Art League Houston (ALH).
