= Bermekimab =

Monoclonal antibody

Monoclonal antibody
- Type: Whole antibody
- Source: Human
- Target: IL-1α

Clinical data
- Trade names: Xilonix
- Other names: MABp1
- Routes of administration: intravenous
- ATC code: L01FX11 (WHO)

Identifiers
- CAS Number: 1401965-15-8
- DrugBank: DB14947
- ChemSpider: none
- UNII: N6SVN735GY
- KEGG: D11253

Chemical and physical data
- Formula: C_{6464}H_{10024}N_{1736}O_{2000}S_{44}
- Molar mass: 145468.09 g·mol^{−1}

Bermekimab (MABp1, trade name Xilonix) is a human monoclonal antibody of IgG1k isotype targeting Interleukin 1 alpha (IL-1α).

Bermekimab was developed by XBiotech Inc.

After Phase III trials in Poland failed to show significant improvement in either lean body mass or quality of life, the European Medicines Agency (EMA) rejected the drug application.

The company Janssen Pharmaceutical acquired the license for the drug from XBiotech for the treatment of atopic dermatitis and hidradenitis suppurativa for $750 million.

As of June 2021, bermekimab was also terminated in phase III clinical trials as an immunotherapy for advanced colorectal cancer. The original aim was to treat the debilitating symptoms seen in patients with advanced colorectal cancer, such as muscle wasting. The study was terminated as it had crossed the prospective futility boundary of the primary endpoint.

As of March 2021 an additional phase II clinical trial for the treatment of atopic dermatitis was completed. In February 2022, Janssen and Johnson & Johnson announced ending development of bermekimab in eczema but said it will continue to work on the previously rejected XBiotech drug in hidradenitis suppurativa (HS). The move resulted in a $610 million pretax impairment charge. As of January 2023, bermekimab is no longer being developed for hidradenitis suppurativa.
