= Naydeen González-De Jesús =

Naydeen González-De Jesús is an American academic administrator who served as the thirteenth president of San Antonio College from 2023 to 2024.

== Life ==
González-De Jesús earned a bachelor's degree in journalism from Pennsylvania State University. She completed a master's degree in student personnel services at Rowan University. She received a doctorate in industrial and organizational psychology from Northcentral University.

González-De Jesús held administrator roles at Bergen Community College, Rowan College at Burlington County, and Salem Community College. During her time at Bergen Community College, González-De Jesús developed Project Graduation, an initiative that greatly enhanced student completion rates while creating economic mobility opportunities for graduates. Her efforts propelled the college to the top of the state for graduation rates. In 2014, González-De Jesús was selected to serve as board member of 1812ADA, Inc., an organization focused on removing barriers to success for individuals protected under the American with Disabilities Act. She was later a public diplomacy officer at the Embassy of the United States, Buenos Aires. While serving at the Embassy of the United States, Buenos Aires, she collaborated within the Public Affairs team, contributing to the signing of the Education Memorandum of Understanding with Argentina's Ministry of Education during the 2018 G20 Summit, in addition to supporting the Fulbright Commission in Argentina and strengthening U.S.-Argentina bilateral relations. In 2019 she received a certificate in ministerial studies from Global University and has served as guest speaker of the JTMR international radio podcast since then.

In 2020, González-De Jesús was appointed as the executive vice president of student success at Milwaukee Area Technical College. While at Milwaukee Area Technical College, in partnership with the University of Wisconsin-Milwaukee, she collaborated with the Equity Transfer Initiative to align transfer pathways and increase completion rates with a focus on adults and first-generation learners. By teaming up with Milwaukee's mayor and M-Cubed partners from Milwaukee Public Schools (MPS) and the University of Wisconsin-Milwaukee (UWM), González-De Jesús collaborated in the launch of Free Application for Federal Student Aid completion efforts, which increased FAFSA completion rates for MPS seniors at a rate higher than the Wisconsin state average. In 2022, González-De Jesús served as board member of the Latino Chamber of Commerce of Southeastern Wisconsin, Inc. On January 9, 2023, she became the thirteenth president of San Antonio College, becoming the second female to serve in the position.

While at San Antonio College, González-De Jesús established Front and Center, a weekly morning show on KSYM 90.1 FM, which explored trends in higher education, San Antonio College news, and the student college experience. In March 2024, González-De Jesús was honored as the 2024 San Antonio Woman of the Year by the Texas Diversity Council, recognizing her outstanding achievements and unwavering commitment to student success and community empowerment. Later that month, following discussions around the Gaza war, González-De Jesús transitioned from her role as president to a presidential project executive position with the Alamo Colleges District. This new role allows her to focus on strategic initiatives and projects that enhance the district's mission. In August 2024, González-De Jesús was recognized by Marquis Who's Who.
