= Jesse Almazán =

Jesse Almazán (June 2, 1937–March 31, 2002), was a San Antonio-based fine and commercial artist, as well as a gallerist. He was a co-founder of Con Safo, a Chicano art group in San Antonio, Texas that has been called one of the most important Chicano art groups in the country. The group initially met in the Galerias Almazán, which he founded in 1968 in the La Villita section of San Antonio, which is one of the city's oldest neighborhoods, located close to the Alamo Mission, and directly across the street from HemisFair '68, the world's fair that took place at that time in HemisFair Park.

== Biography ==
Almazán was a 1955 graduate of Fox Technical High School. He attended the Michael Frary School of Art while still at Fox Tech. He subsequently studied at the San Antonio Art Center School of Art, the now defunct San Antonio Art Institute, then associated with the McNay Art Museum, and the Hunter School of Art (1955-59). The latter was operated by Warren Hunter, an eminent local commercial artist, who gave scholarships to promising Mexican American commercial art students. His time at the Hunter School overlapped with José Esquivel, who also became a member of the Con Safo art group.

Almazán was in The United States Naval Reserve for six years. He worked at Kelly Air Force Base, Electronic Security Command, United States Air Force for 34 years as an illustrator in the civil service. According to his widow Maggie, Almazán had a very high security clearance, and he worked "in a bunker within a bunker on spy hill." According to one account, "he traveled to Europe many times, once for a six-month period, trips that provided exposure to the Old Masters and a range of artists found in European museums." During that time, he also maintained an independent career as a commercial and fine artist.

== Art ==
Almazán worked in watercolor, gouache, acrylic, and oil. He also designed graphics and posters. His graphics were very complex, and often had a puzzle-like nature, including two logos made for the Con Safo group. He frequently utilized animals and Pachucos--was well as animals dressed as Pachucos. The artist had a preference for "jagged edges, and acute angles that produce a powerful graphic sense with stripped down and simplified forms." His painting Barrios (c. 1970s) "reveals his love of geometric angularity [utilized to] indicate the vibrancy of Mexican-American neighborhoods." Stylistically, it has been connected to the work of Joaquín Torres-García from the 1930s.

Almazán had what artist Cesar Martinez called a "protean" style: he was able to work in the style of numerous artists, while endowing these stylistic appropriations with Chicano content. His portrait of United Farm Workers union leader César Chávez, for instance, has what has been described as possessing "pop" qualities, influenced by graphic designer Milton Glaser. Another art historian notes the influences of European painters Henrí Matisse and Wassily Kandinsky, as well as that of the Argentine Xul Solar.

Almazán was admitted to the Men of Art Guild, the pre-eminent local art group, when he was 19-years old, the first Mexican American in the group. Esquivel also became a member of Men of Art, and in some way the group could be considered a precedent for the Con Safo art group.

Group members had differing opinions on the origins of Chicano art. Almazán connected the origins of Chicano art to the Con Safo art group. The first group exhibition, American Theme Phase One, "Cowboys," opened at Galerias Almazán in November of 1968. Almazán designed the brochure for the exhibition, which traveled to the Courtney Gallery in Houston. The group was referenced as "6 artists on one theme," rather than by name.

According to Reyes, the primary group founder, Almazán and Esquivel were moderating forces, due to their jobs. They prevented the Con Safo group from taking a more radical or activist path. Almazán, who was deeply opposed to art historian Jacinto Quirarte, proposed a boycott of his symposium, as well as a counter-exhibition. His anger broke out at a Con Safo meeting in 1973, and it contributed to a fracturing of the group, with the permanent departures of two founding members, José Esquivel and Roberto Ríos. Almazán was absent from group meetings in the summer of 1974, and it has been argued that he had probably left the group at an earlier date.

Almazán frequently won awards for his watercolors. In 1968, Almazán won a poster award sponsored by the Hispanic Employment Managers Program, and he presented the poster to President Ronald Reagan in the Rose Garden in Washington, D.C. In 1990, he won the contest for the Tejano Conjunto Festival en San Antonio, sponsored by the Guadalupe Cultural Arts Center.

Almazán exhibited continuously at his gallery while it was in operation. According to art historian Ann Marie Leimer, the gallery was in operation from 1968-1971. He also exhibited frequently with the Men of Art and Con Safo groups. Almazan was the subject of a retrospective in 2007 and a three-person show at Centro de Artes in 2020, along with two other Con Safo members, José Esquivel and Rudy Treviño.

== Books and catalogues ==
Cordova, Ruben C. (2005). "Con Safo," in Ilan Stavans, ed. in chief, and Harold Augenbraum, assoc. ed., Encyclopedia Latina: History, Culture, and Society in the United States. Danbury, Conn.: Grolier Academic Reference.

Cordova, Ruben Charles. (2009). Con Safo : The Chicano Art Group and the Politics of South Texas. Los Angeles: UCLA Chicano Studies Research Center Press.

Cordova, Ruben C. (2025). “The Con Safo Art Group (1968-1976), San Antonio, Texas,” in Rocio Aranda-Alvarado and Deborah Cullen-Morales, eds., A Handbook of Latinx Art, Oakland: University of California Press, Documents of Twentieth Century Art series.

Leimer, Ann Marie. (2020). Los Maestros 2020: Early Explorers of Chicano Identity. City of San Antonio: Department of Arts & Culture at Centro de Artes Gallery.
