= BioBridge Global =

American holding company

BioBridge Global is a San Antonio-based nonprofit holding company that operates the South Texas Blood & Tissue Center, QualTex Laboratories, GenCure, and The Blood and Tissue Center Foundation. BioBridge Global supplies products and services in blood resource management, cellular therapy, donated umbilical cord blood and human tissue, and testing of blood, plasma, and tissue. The organization was initially established as the South Texas Regional Blood Bank in 1973.

== Organization ==
The South Texas Blood & Tissue Center supplies blood products and blood research management for hospitals, dialysis centers, and emergency clinics in the South Texas area.

QualTex Laboratories facilitate testing of blood, plasma, and other human cells and tissues. QualTex Laboratories are located in San Antonio, TX and Norcross, GA.

GenCure focuses on the development of cell-based therapies, providing biomanufacturing capabilities for clinical research and use. GenCure operates the Texas Cord Blood Bank, which collects and processes umbilical cord for banking, stem cell therapy, and research.

== History ==
The company was originally founded in 1973 by three San Antonio physicians, Charles Robinson, MD, Robert F. Gossett, MD, and Michael H. Sulak MD, in conjunction with the Bexar County Medical Society charter, as the South Texas Regional Blood Bank. The company opened for business in 1974. Norman D Kalmin, MD was hired in 1983 and served as the center's first President, chief executive officer and medical director. During his tenure, tissue services were added and in 1994 the center was renamed the South Texas Blood and Tissue Center. Additional services such as participation in the national bone marrow donor program and subsidiaries such as the Texas Cord Blood Bank and Qualtex Laboratories (established in 2007 as a separate nonprofit dedicated exclusively to providing infectious disease testing to blood, plasma and tissue services throughout the nation) were added. A foundation was also established to help fund programs such as the Texas cord blood program. Dr Kalmin retired after 27 years' service and served an additional 4 years as the part time medical director of the Qualtex Laboratory branch in Norcross, Georgia.

Linda Myers, who joined South Texas Blood & Tissue Center in 1994, led QualTex until becoming Interim President and CEO of BioBridge Global in 2012.

GenCure was established in 2011 to expand the company services in to regenerative medicine.

In 2012, the Board of the South Texas Blood & Tissue Center created a holding company, later named as BioBridge Global, to oversee its operating units. BioBridge Global was announced as the name of the holding company in 2013. Linda Myers, previously President and Chief Operating Officer of QualTex, served as Interim President and CEO since January 2013 until she was confirmed by the Board in March.

BioBridge Global joined the San Antonio Chamber of Commerce in 2013.

In 2014, BioBridge Global constructed lab space inside its San Antonio headquarters building for research and development involving various types of adult stem cells. Collaboration with San Antonio biotech firm StemBioSys expanded the use of that facility into umbilical cord blood stem cell products.

During the Western African Ebola virus epidemic spanning 2013–2016, BioBridge Global collaborated with XBioTech Inc. to collect and evaluate blood samples from Ebola survivor Amber Vinson, a Dallas nurse who attended Thomas Eric Duncan, the first Ebola patient diagnosed in the United States. Vinson's blood was collected at the South Texas Blood & Tissue Center in Austin, then brought to San Antonio for routine testing at QualTex Laboratories.

Since 2016, Martin Landon has led the company as CEO.

In 2016, BioBridge Global led a four-organization biotech team to win a $7.8 million contract from the Medical Technology Enterprise Consortium, a biomedical technology association that collaborates with multiple government agencies under an agreement with the U.S. Army Medical Research and Materiel Command. The other members organizations of the team were the U.S. Army Institute of Surgical Research Coagulation and Blood Research, StemBioSys, and Maryland-based RoosterBio Inc. The funding supported the development of large-scale manufacturing capabilities for clinical-grade stem cells to be used for regenerative medicine research and therapeutic purposes.

BioBridge Global won the 2016 Award for Excellence from the Balanced Scorecard Institute for working to identify and fill strategic capability gaps in the organization as part of its strategic plan.

During the 2020 COVID-19 pandemic, BioBridge Global's QualTex Laboratories partnered with XBiotech Inc. to develop a clinical test for the presence of antibodies against SARS-CoV-2, the virus that causes COVID-19. Blood donated to the South Texas Blood & Tissue Center would be tested for these antibodies to identify candidate donors for convalescent plasma therapy.

BioBridge Global did not receive a loan from the Paycheck Protection Program, which was implemented during the COVID-19 pandemic by the federal CARES Act to largely help employers retain workers during the economic crisis.
