= César Martínez (artist) =

American painter (born 1944)

Cesar Martinez
- Born: 1944 (age 81–82); Laredo, Texas, U.S.
- Education: Texas A&I College
- Known for: Portraiture, Painting
- Website: http://www.cesaramartinez.com

César Augusto Martínez (born 1944 in Laredo, Texas) is an artist, prominent in the field of Chicano art. While studying at what was then called Texas A&I College (later Texas A&I University), he became involved in the Chicano movement for civil rights. He subsequently befriended several of its leaders.

Martínez is best known for his depictions of Chicano social types, which are referred to generically as 'batos" and "rucas." They are composite images, taken from vintage magazines, photographs, yearbook pictures, obituaries, and other sources. The artist has refined these images in paintings, drawings, and prints for many years.

Martínez also takes mythological subjects, South Texas folklore, and the Southwest landscape as subjects. He is also a photographer.

Martínez has been based in San Antonio, Texas since 1971.

== Early life ==
Martínez was raised by his mother and her family in Laredo. His father died when he was an infant. He graduated from Martin High School in Laredo, Texas. Martínez received an Education Bachelor of Science Degree in All-Level Art Education from Texas A&I University, Kingsville, Texas, in 1968. Martínez, rather than expecting to be an artist, had hoped to become a bullfighter, and he has often utilized bullfighting imagery in his art.

Martínez was drafted into the army in 1969. After serving in California and Korea, he moved to San Antonio in 1971.

== Artistic career ==
Before he began making images of people in 1978 (the batos and rucas noted above), Martínez experimented with color field painting. He joined the Con Safo art group in San Antonio in late 1972, and he resigned in November 1974. Martínez organized an exhibition under the name Los Quemados in June 1975 at the Mexican Cultural Institute in San Antonio. He'd hoped that Los Quemados would become an informal association of artists without officers and guidelines, but, he says, "it never really gelled." One more Los Quemados exhibition was held in San Antonio at St. Philip's College on September 16, 1975.

When Martínez decided to make images of people, his greatest inspiration came from Salvador "El Queso" Torres' drawings of Mexican Americans, which Martínez saw in San Diego. He also acknowledges other California artists, including José Montoya and Rupert García.

He was also influenced by diverse sources. Martínez was captivated by Alberto Giacometti's solitary figures (which he saw in reproduction), and by his obsessive working practices. As a photographer, Martínez was impressed by Richard Avedon's "deadpan" frontal images, as well as by Fritz Scholder's colorful frontal images. Martínez also acknowledges several abstract artists: Mark Rothko, Jules Olitski, Philip Guston, Kenneth Noland, and Gene Davis. Martínez ultimately added a band of color at the top of his paintings of people.

Martínez's images of people are sourced from pictures from the 1940s and 1950s. The artist points out that during those periods Mexican Americans "were seen as rebellious because of their dress. Clothing became politicized because it was seen as an emblem of difference, so it relates to racism." Martínez uses accurate details, but he mixes them freely, sometimes combining details from different decades in his quest to, as he puts it, "make the characters 'realer than real.'" Since he is keenly aware of the distortions imposed by photography, Martínez makes distortions and fine calibrations of his own.

Martínez does not utilize living models because he cannot transport models from the past. His goals as an artist often sound paradoxical: "there might be a figure, but the essence is abstract, because it's a very elusive 'reality' that I am searching for. Too much perfection would kill it." He wants his works to be "powerful," to have "edge," to "ring true," but he says they are also ultimately "ambiguous." They must have "pictorial rhythm and balance," and he thinks generalized images are "more universal."

Among Martínez's best known works are his three large painted versions of Hombre que le Gustan las Mujeres (The Man Who Loves Women). They were made in 1985, 1989, and 2000. The paintings depict a man with three contradictory tattoos: the Virgin Mary is featured on his chest; an almost naked pin-up girl is on his right arm, and a stereotypical "good girl" is on his left. To emphasize the man's confusion, he is depicted with two heads in the second version, which is called Wrong-Headed Hombre (the first two paintings are in private collections). Whereas the first version had rudimentary tattoos, the third one has more complex tattoos, particularly the Virgin of Guadalupe. The latter is in the Cheech Marin Center for Chicano Art and Culture in Riverside, CA.

Two other paintings by Martínez were featured in the inaugural exhibition of the Cheech Center, which formed a triptych: Bato con Sunglasses and Sylvia with Chango's Letter Jacket, both from 2000. The artist described the former as: "my idea of ultra-cool when I was a teenager.... Though I've never portrayed myself as a bato con sunglasses, I have been asked if it is me in some of them…. perhaps it is my affinity with the subject coming through. This cool bato con sunglasses character is very generic, mysterious and idealized, but in spite of all the ones I've done, this character remains an enigma, challenging and elusive for me." Sylvia Wearing Chago's Letter Jacket is a unique variation on the proud batos wearing their own high school letter jackets.

Speaking of his batos and rucas, Martínez says: "When my work succeeds, it projects Chicano culture from my--presumably our--perspective. I like to think that I am contributing to culture in general by affirming ours."

In addition to his work as a painter, printmaker, and draftsman, Martínez is also a photographer. He took important historical photographs of the Chicano movement. Many were first published in short-lived Chicano publications, such as Magazín and Caracol, and they are often republished without attribution. A number of these historic photographs are included in the book Con Safo. Eight photographs of the United Farm Worker (UFW) eagle stenciled on various objects (including the Alamo cenotaph in San Antonio) are featured in the catalogue The Other Side of the Alamo: Art Against the Myth.

In 1997, Martinez was the International Artist in Residence at Artpace in San Antonio, TX. In 1999, he was the Visiting Artist at the University of Texas at San Antonio, San Antonio, TX. In 1999, Martínez also had a retrospective at The McNay Art Museum in San Antonio, TX.

== Exhibitions ==
=== Solo exhibitions ===
- 2017 – West Kings Highway: The Work of César A. Martínez, the National Museum of Mexican Art, Chicago, IL; curator: Benito Huerta
- 2015 – Modes, Rustberg Gallery, The University of Texas Rio Grande Valley, Brownsville, TX César A. Martínez, An Overview: Old and New, North American Gallery, McAllen, TX
- 2011 – Batos y Más: Recent Work by César A. Martínez, Morgan Gallery, St. Philip's College, San Antonio, TX
- 2008 – César A. Martínez & Gaspar Enriquez: New Works, Galería Ortiz Contemporary, San Antonio, TX
- 2006 – César A. Martínez, Yuma Art Center Museum, Yuma, AZ Vistas of the Frontera: César A. Martínez Paintings, Tucson Museum of Art, Tucson AZ
- 2001 – César A. Martínez. Student Union Art Gallery, Boise State University, Boise, ID
- 1999 – César A. Martínez: A Retrospective, The McNay Art Museum, San Antonio, TX; (catalogue)
- 1999 – César A. Martínez 1999 Artist of the Year, San Antonio Art League Museum, San Antonio, TX; (catalogue)
- 1998- César A. Martínez: Cultura de South Texas, Art Museum of South Texas, Corpus Christi, TX; curator: Benito Huerta (catalogue)
- 1997 – New Works: 97.3, Artpace, San Antonio, TX
- 1995 – César A. Martínez: Reflejos Mestizos, El Paso Museum of Art, El Paso, TX; (catalogue)
- 1991 – César A. Martínez: Three Major Series, Ben P. Bailey Gallery, Texas A & I University, Kingsville, TX
- 1990 – César A. Martínez Exhibition, MARS (Movimiento Artístico del Rio Salado), Phoenix, AZ
- 1990 – César A. Martínez: Mixed Media Paintings, San Angelo Museum of Fine Art, San Angelo, TX
- 1988 – There's a Chicano in There Somewhere, Guadalupe Cultural Arts Center, Guadalupe Theater Gallery, San Antonio, TX

=== Group exhibitions ===
Martínez has exhibited his work at the Fresno Metropolitan Museum; Centro Cultural Aztlán in San Antonio, Texas; and the Yerbabuena Center for the Arts, San Francisco, among other venues.

== Collections ==
- American Art Museum, Smithsonian Institution,
- Art Museum of South Texas, Corpus Christi, TX
- Austin Museum of Art, Austin, TX
- Blanton Museum of Art, Austin, TX
- Brownsville Museum of Fine Art, Brownsville, TX
- Cheech Marin Center for Chicano Art, Culture & Industry, of the Riverside Art Museum, Riverside, California
- El Paso Museum of Art, El Paso, TX
- Linda Pace Foundation, San Antonio, TX
- McNay Art Museum,
- Museo de Arte Moderno, Mexico City
- Museum of Fine Arts, Houston, TX
- Museum of Latin American Art, Long Beach, CA
- Museum of TTU Association, Lubbock, TX
- National Museum of Mexican Art, Chicago, IL
- Polk Museum of Art, Lakeland, FL
- San Antonio Museum of Art,
- The University of Texas at San Antonio, San Antonio, TX
- Vero Beach Museum of Art, Vero Beach, FL

== Honors and awards ==
- 1985 – Best Painting, Museo del Barrio, New York City, NY
- 1999 – Retrospective at the McNay Art Museum, San Antonio, TX
- 1999 – Artist of the Year, San Antonio Art League Museum, San Antonio, TX
- 2017 – Distinction in the Arts Award, City of San Antonio Department of Arts & Culture, San Antonio, TX
- 2026 -- Lifetime Achievement Award in the Visual Arts, Art League Houston
