= San Antonio College =

Community college in San Antonio, Texas, US

Coordinates: 29.446°N 98.497°W

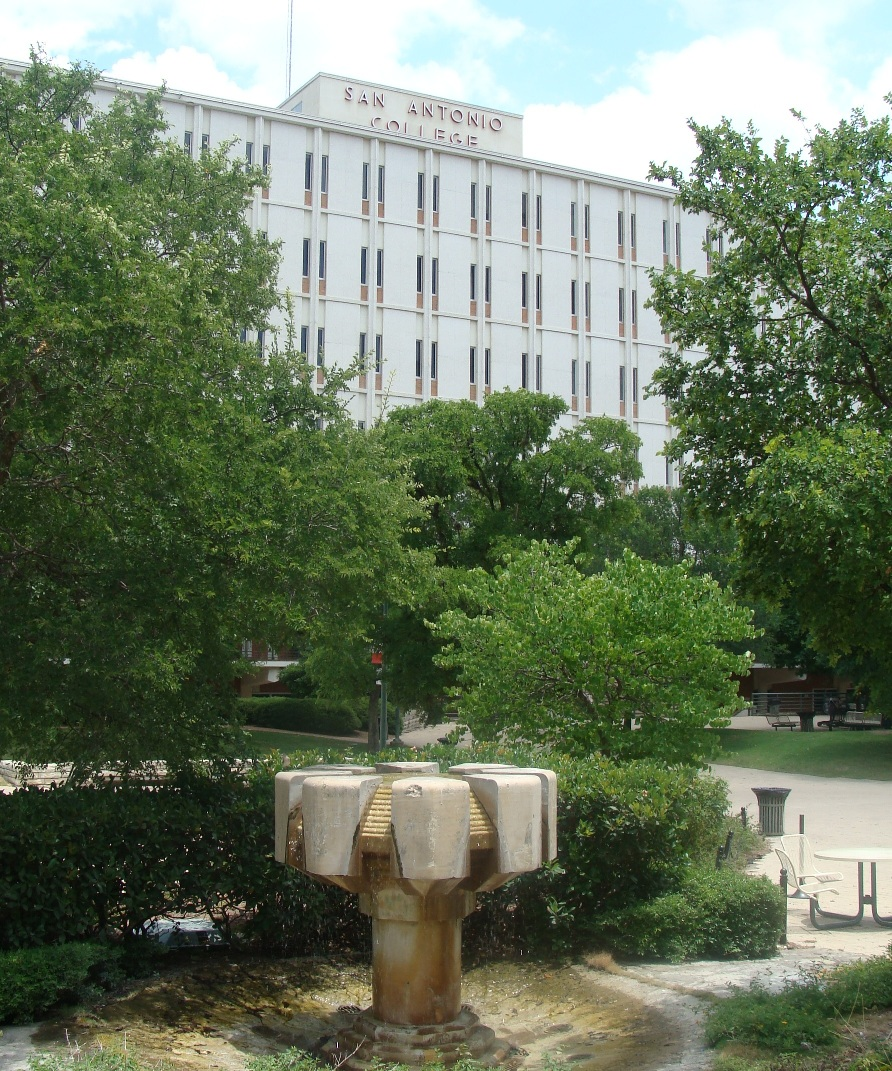
- Type: Public community college
- Established: 1925
- Chancellor: Mike Flores
- Students: 17,457
- Location: San Antonio, Texas, United States
- Colors: Red, Black, and Blue
- Mascot: The Armadillos
- Website: alamo.edu/sac

San Antonio College (SAC) is a public community college in San Antonio, Texas. It is part of the Alamo Colleges District and the oldest public two-year college in Texas. The college has an average semester enrollment of 22,028 credit students and an average annual enrollment of 16,000 other-than-credit students. San Antonio College is the largest single-campus community college in Texas and one of the largest in the United States.

San Antonio College provides academic, vocational, and professional education that allow students to continue their education at a university or four-year college. It also provides offerings in occupational and technical courses and has assumed the San Antonio Independent School District's continuing-education programs.

== History ==
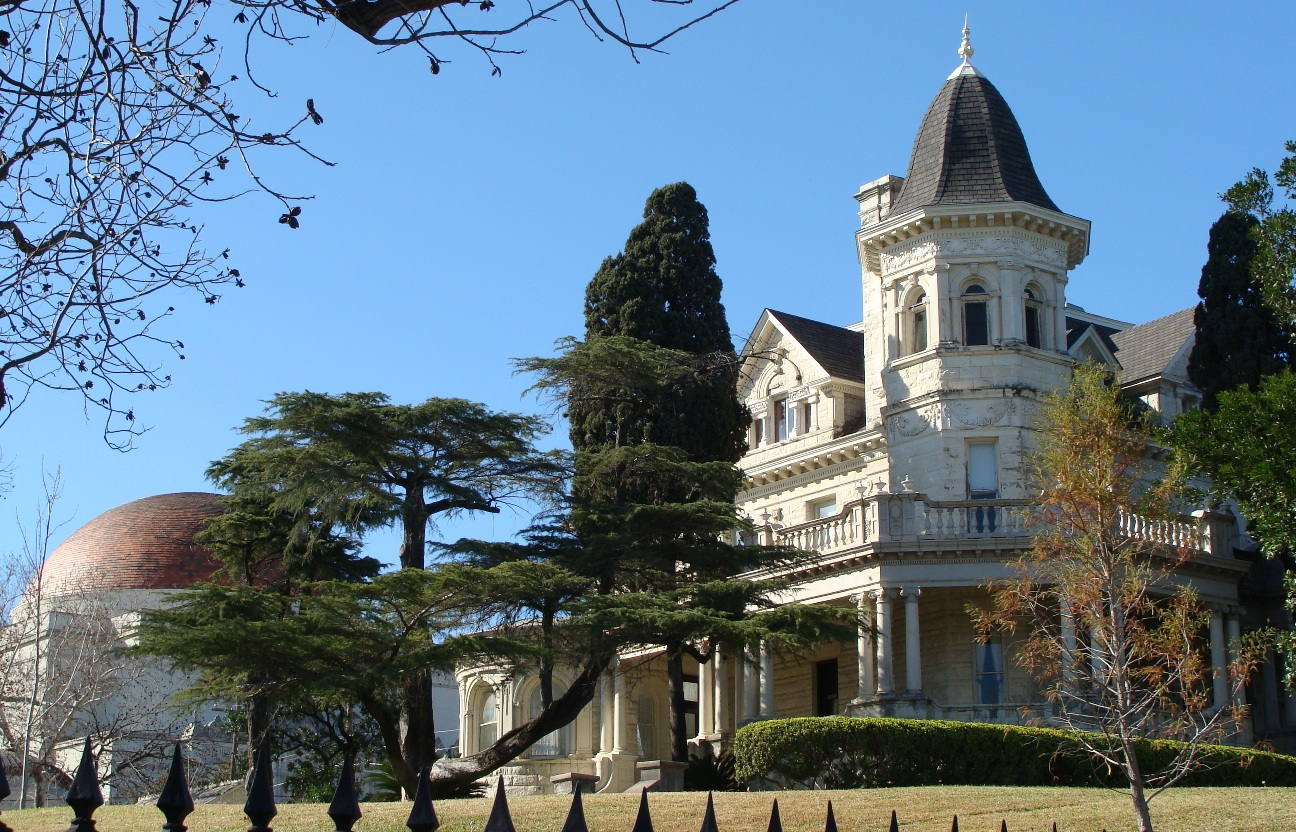
Koehler Cultural Center

On September 21, 1925, SAC was first established as University Junior College under the administration of the University of Texas, with an enrollment of 200 students. However, the attorney general for Texas ruled (December 30, 1925) that the University of Texas was in violation of the state's constitution by operating a junior college. Therefore, the college was passed to the San Antonio Board of Education and renamed San Antonio Junior College. In September 1926, the college relocated to 419 South Alamo Street. In August 1946, San Antonio Junior College was renamed again after control of the school passed from the board of trustees. San Antonio College was adopted as the official name in 1948, and in 1951, SAC was moved to its present location on San Pedro Avenue. In 2016, the college changed the address from San Pedro Avenue to North Main Avenue another street on campus. Accreditation was granted to the college in 1955 from the Southern Association of Colleges and Schools.

== Academics ==
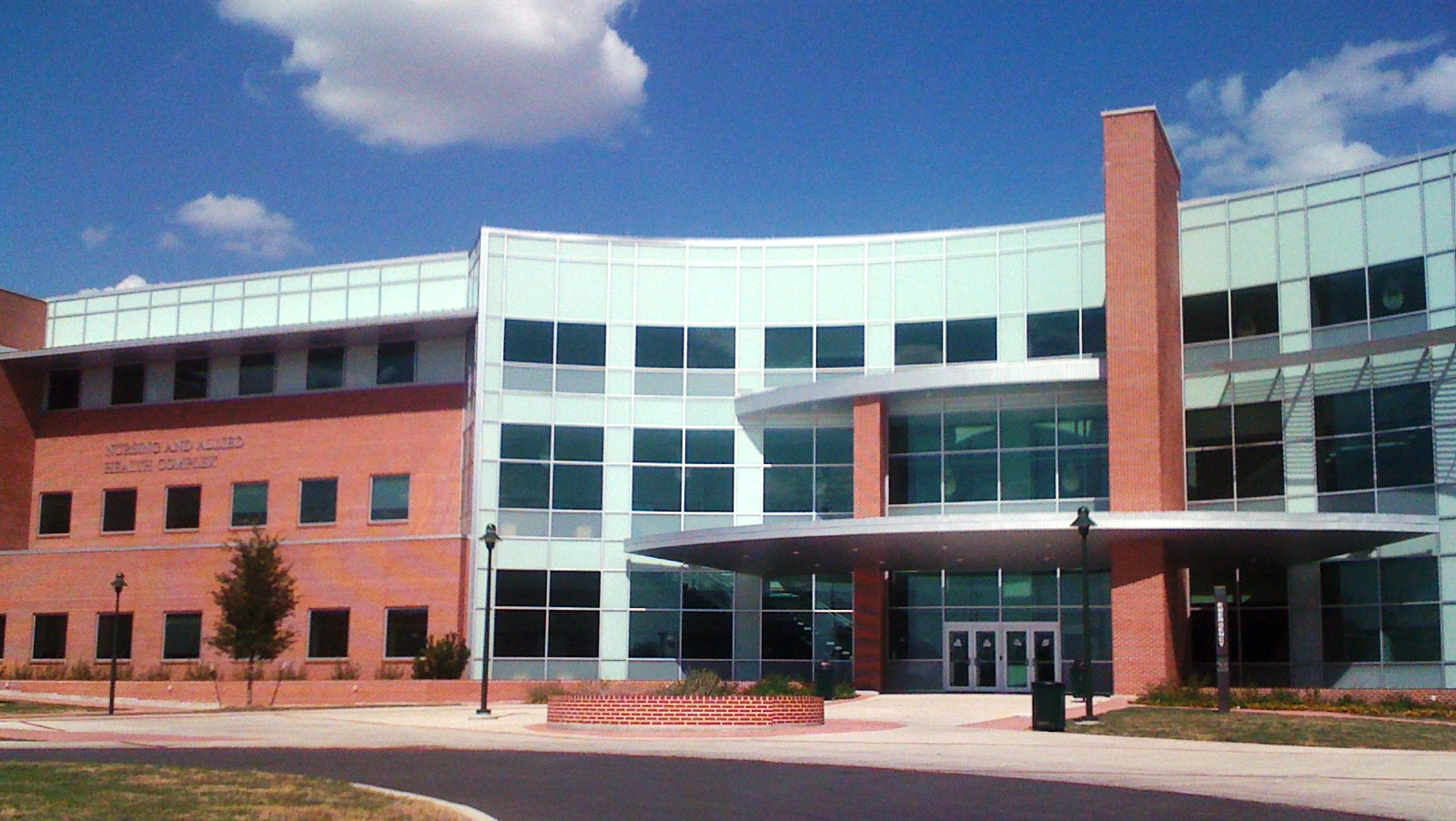
Allied Health and Nursing Complex

SAC provides general education, liberal arts and sciences, career education, continuing education, and developmental education. In December 2007, the Texas Higher Education Coordinating Board awarded San Antonio College a rating of "exemplary" for seven of its academic programs. However, in January 2008, the rating was revised to include additional programs bringing the total to 11. The 11 programs receiving this designation are business management, computer-aided design, dental assisting, radio-TV and film, nursing education, finance and financial management, medical assisting, mortuary science, American sign language/interpreter training, public administration, and real estate. This rating means that all 11 programs exceed the state's required standards of excellence in education.

San Antonio College was designated a National Center of Academic Excellence in cyber defense by the National Security Agency and the Department of Homeland Security. The designation was made in recognition of significant contributions in meeting the national demand for cyber defense education, developing cyber defense experts and ultimately contributing to the protection of the national information infrastructure.

According to the Institute of Education Sciences, in 2016 San Antonio had a 14% graduation rate and 61% transfer-out rate when given 150% of the time needed to complete an associate degree for full-time, first-time degree-seeking students. Of the 20,000 plus students enrolled, only 18% attended full-time.

The college is accredited by the Southern Association of Colleges and Schools. It is also approved or accredited by the Board of Nurse Examiners for the state of Texas, the Association of Texas Colleges and Universities, the Texas Educational Theater Association, the Texas Association of Music Schools, the National League for Nursing, the American Board of Funeral Service Education, the American Association of Community and Junior Colleges, the Southern Association of Junior Colleges, the Commission of Dental Accreditation of the American Dental Association, the Commission on Accreditation of Allied Health Education Programs, and the Texas Public Community and Junior College Association.

== Campus life ==
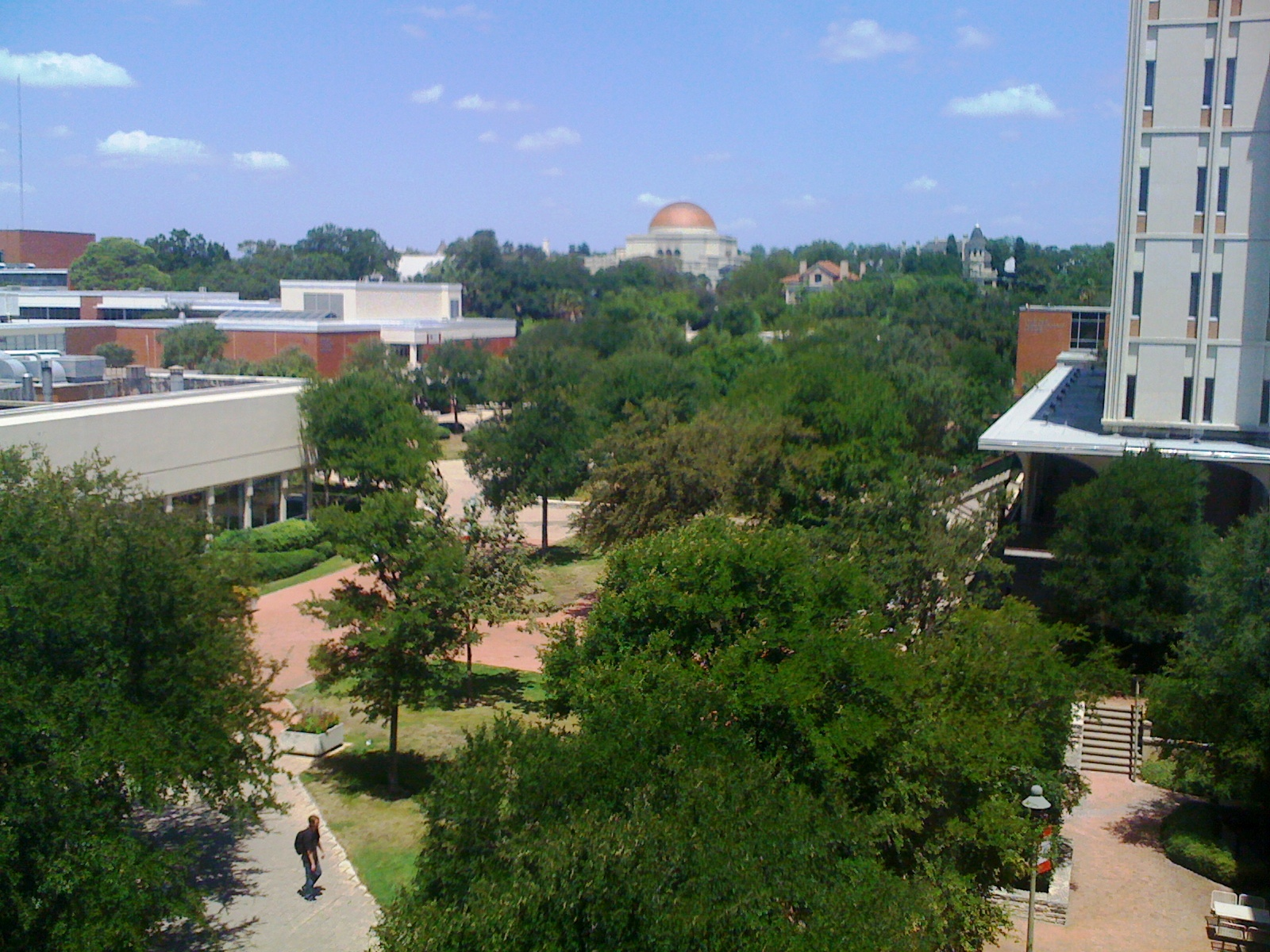
The SAC campus

The SAC Recreation Sports department provides scheduled intramural and extramural activities. Extramural activities are organized team sports in which teams compete with Alamo Colleges District schools and other organized collegiate teams from the South-central Texas region. Intramural activities are organized team sports in which teams compete with other teams organized within the college, and are also scheduled on campus.

Students attending SAC can pursue a wide range of subjects and activities. As a community college, SAC allows students to pursue associate degrees and certifications and take courses transferable to many institutions of higher education. SAC offers 64 different associate degrees and 68 certificates. The college has over 300 2+2 articulation agreements with various colleges and universities. The 2+2 articulation agreements serve to facilitate the admission and academic transfer of students from participating community colleges such as SAC to a participating four-year college or university within Texas. As students progress successfully toward the completion of the associate degree, this agreement ensures a seamless transition of the student's coursework and aids the student by increasing the number of transferable hours.

== Student newspaper ==
SAC also hosts The Ranger, a student newspaper. The student newspaper is a laboratory project of the journalism classes in the Department of Journalism-Photography. The newspaper is published on Fridays except during the summer, holidays, and examinations. The Ranger is also a member of the Texas Intercollegiate Press Association, the Associated Collegiate Press, the Texas Community College Journalism Association, and the Associated Press. The publication was selected as a National Pacemaker Award winner by the Associated College Press for 2004 and a Pacemaker Finalist for 2005.

The Ranger has made its articles available to students online. Students now have the option of accessing it in either print or online media formats.

In May 2024, the newspaper was renamed to The Sundial and ceased its print edition, becoming online-only.

== Mascot ==
San Antonio College's mascot was the Ranger. The school pride colors are red, black, and royal blue School colors were previously orange and white (1925 – late 1980s), orange, blue, and white (late 1980s – mid 1990s), and red and black (mid-1990s – ?). The mascot was unanimously voted to be removed by the college board on July 14, 2020, due to the image of the Ranger representing perceived racism towards Hispanics and Mexican-Americans. The new mascot, the Armadillo, was chosen after a student vote in May 2021.

== Notable people ==
=== Alumni ===
- Paul Bearer, professional wrestling manager
- Albert Bustamante, U.S. Representative (1985–1993)
- Hector Hugo Gonzalez, nurse educator
- Henry B. Gonzalez, U.S. Representative (1961–1999)
- Cyndi Taylor Krier, Texas State Senator (1985–1993)
- Michael Nesmith, guitarist for The Monkees
- Ciro D. Rodriguez, U.S. Representative (1997–2005 & 2007–2011)
- Francis R. Scobee, commander of the Space Shuttle Challenger
- Herbert Spiro, political scientist, United States Ambassador to Cameroon (1975–1977)

=== Faculty ===
- Naydeen González-De Jesús, thirteenth president (2023–2024)
