= Guadalupe Cultural Arts Center =

The Guadalupe Cultural Arts Center (GCAC) is a nonprofit arts organization located in the West Side of San Antonio. Its focus is multidisciplinary, with performances, exhibitions, and classes pertaining to music, dance, theater, literature, art, and film, with an emphasis on Chicano, Mexican, Latino, and Native American content. Its origins can be traced to 1979, when several groups of Chicanos/as came together to form the Performance Artists Nucleus, Incorporated (PAN). Its first permanent campus consisted of the Teatro Guadalupe, a large theater from 1940 that had been closed in 1970, and the former Progresso Dugstore, at the intersection of Guadalupe and South Bazos Streets. PAN adopted the name Guadalupe Cultural Arts Center before moving into the theater in 1984. Other buildings were gradually added to the GCAC campus, including Museo Guadalupe, Cesar Chavez Building, La Casita, and Guadalupanita Café.

== Early history ==
PAN board members who played an active role in the early history of the organization include Darío Aguilar, Rodolfo Garcia, David Gonzalez, Angela de Hoyos, and Juan Tejeda. In 1983, Pedro Rodriguez was selected to become the executive director.

The organization quickly launched several annual programs for which it is best known: The Tejano Conjunto Festival (1981), The Christmastime Concert (1982), Hecho A Mano, a fine arts and crafts market (1986). In 1991, the Guadalupe Dance Company was founded, and the Guadalupe Dance Academy began in 1992. According to the GCAC website, it "was one of the first Chicano organizations to collaborate with Mexican artists and cultural institutions, commission and present new works and to pioneer in community cultural education," and it has featured or fostered numerous now-prominent Chicano and Latino visual and performing artists. According to My SA, the GCAC is the "largest community-based, multi-disciplinary organization in the United States."

== Dance program ==
In the early 1990s, the Guadalupe Cultural Arts Center created several dance programs. Following the dissolution of existing folkloric dance companies, it began its own dance program, with classes and performances. In conjunction with the Mexican Cultural Institute of San Antonio, the GCAC also developed a professional dance company featuring folklórico and flamenco dances in 1991. Known as the Guadalupe Dance Company, the professional company maintains an active program and is regarded as "one of the leading professional folklorico and flamenco dance companies in the nation."

== The Tejano Conjunto Festival ==
Overseen by accordionist Juan Tejeda, the Tejano Conjunto Festival became the largest in the country, as well as one of the GCAC's signature annual events. At its peak, 50,000 people participated in the festival over its six-day duration. According to then-director Rodriguez, Tejeda "took conjunto out of the bars and onto the stage.”

More than twenty musicians appear in the annual festival, which has included many well-known accordionists, including Los Dos Gilbertos, Flaco Jimenez, Esteban Jordan, Tony de la Rosa, and Ruben Vela. It has also served as a showcase for emerging accordionists. The GCAC maintains a Conjunto Music Hall of Fame that inducts performers as part of the festival. The GCAC also runs an annual competition for the Conjunto Festival.

== Literary festival and bookstore ==
In 1985, the 1st Annual Texas Small Press Bookfair was organized by author Sandra Cisneros (then the literary director) and publisher Bryce Milligan. It sought to support and showcase small publishing houses. The Bookfair developed into the Inter-American Book Fair & Literary Festival in 1987. In addition to emerging writers, it featured famous authors, such as Isabel Allende, Maya Angelu, Alurista, Ernesto Cardenal, Carlos Fuentes, Larry McMurtry, Elena Poniatowska, and Alice Walker.

After the Book Fair & Literary Festival was long defunct, an unanticipated $1 million gift to the GCAC from MacKenzie Scott and her husband Dan Jewett gave the organization the resources to open a bookstore in 2021 and to begin an author's series in 2022.
