= Mexican American folklore =

Folklore written or spoken by Mexican Americans

Mexican American folklore refers to the tales and history of Chicano people who live in the United States. People of Spanish descent, or Chicano people, have been living in the southwestern part of the United States since Mexico had been a colony of the Spanish empire prior to 1821. Mexico gained independence in the aftermath of the Mexican war of independence. Following the Mexican–American War, “most of this area, almost half of Mexico's northern territory, was ceded to the United States, and approximately 80,000 Spanish-Mexican-Indian people suddenly became inhabitants of the United States”. After the war, the United States acquired a huge chunk of land and, as a result all of the Mexican nationals living in the area were now part of the United States. Citizens of the U.S. began flooding into the area to find land to live on.

== Notable examples ==
=== La Llorona ===
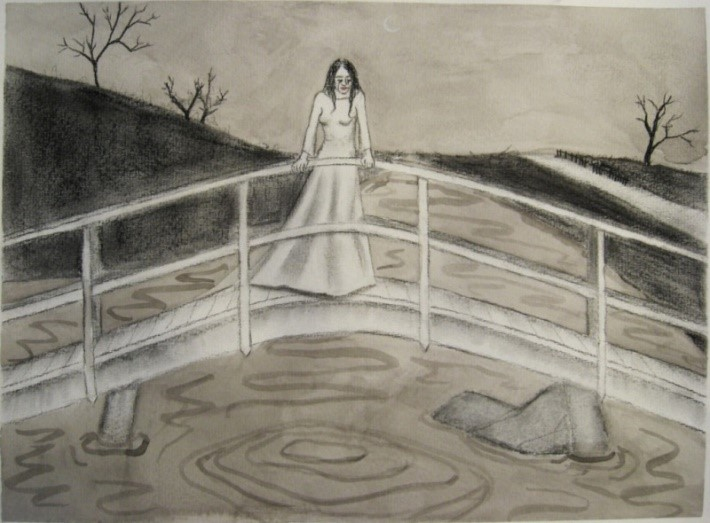
Drawing of the La Llorona

A well-known example in Chicano folklore is La Llorona, the weeping woman. There are varying different variations of La Llorona. One common account is that she is the ghost of a murderous mother who haunts near water like river banks or lake shores. She is always described as having long hair, down below her waist, and is seen wearing a white gown. As the tale goes, her lover left her with their two children. Angrily, she drowned her children in an act of revenge or grief. For that reason, she is doomed to walk the earth forever in search of her children. La Llorona “serves as a cultural allegory, instructing people how to live and act within established social mores”. Her tale is often used as a bedtime story to get children to go to sleep or behave when out in public. Given the popularity of the legend, there are many works done by “folklorists, literary critics, anthropologists, and feminist writers. Children's books, short stories, novels, and films” are just a few of the ways La Llorona has been inscribed into history. As Gloria Anzaldua, a scholar of Chicana cultural and feminist theory, discussed in her article “How to Tame a Wild Tongue”, living on the U.S. side of the border made it difficult for Hispanics to relate to their national identity due to their oppression by Anglo-American colonizers. These colonizing groups forced those of Hispanic descent to speak English at schools and other institutions. Anzaldua stated how she recalled being caught speaking Spanish at recess and got “three licks on the knuckles with a sharp ruler.”

=== La Mulata de Córdoba ===
The City of Córdoba, founded in 1618, sits upon a hill where coffee and bananas grow. Like much of Mexico, the area has warm and humid weather during the spring and summer seasons and cooler weather in the fall and winter seasons. Prior to its founding, Black rebel forces ruled the area and attacked and robbed the people who lived there, and choked off trade to the neighboring areas. A few respected members of those living there decided to appeal to Sir Fernandez of Córdoba, asking that he make this area an official town, allowing government officials to intervene with the rebels. Because of its rich history, Córdoba is considered a celebrated city. Soon after the signing of the Treaty of Córdoba in 1821 which gave Mexico independence from Spain, the Legend of the Mulata woman is born.

The story of La Mulata de Córdoba begins in the streets of Córdoba, Veracruz. A young woman who lived among the people of Córdoba was often called a bruja (witch) since she was the only one who didn’t seem to age. No one knew of her background nor who her parents were. Because of her perceived beauty, many men vied for her affection but all were unsuccessful. One day, the Holy Office imprisoned her for suspected witchcraft. On the eve of her execution, it was discovered that the woman had disappeared. When questioned, the jailer stated that when she had asked him what the ship she had drawn with charcoal lacked, he said it was perfect and lacked nothing. Afterwards, the woman began to walk into the drawing and the ship started to sail away and the woman disappeared, never to be seen again.

=== Aztlan ===
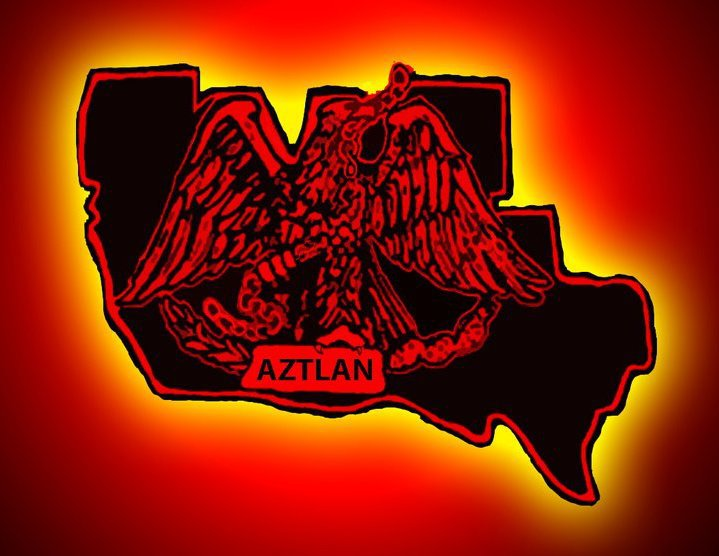
Mythical homeland of Aztlan

Aztlan is the legendary homeland of the Aztecs. During the 1960s, Chicano peoples living in the greater American Southwest began to use the concept of Aztlan as a way to show their pride in their national identity. It came to be known as a mythical homeland for those of Mexican American heritage; an imaginary place "based on a revival of Mexicanismo". Aztlan was a place that was inclusive to all those of Hispanic descent and encouraged them to support one another and live in prosperity.

Some examples refer to Aztlan in terms of land annexation. After the United States conquered the southwestern part of North America, thousands of Mexicans suddenly became Americans and were encouraged to adopt different cultural traditions. They lived on the same land they always had, but were now considered foreigners. According to De la Torre and Gutierrez, two scholars of Chicano studies based in Mexico, due to the “illegal” immigration of the Mexican Americans back and forth across the border, social links and mutual commitments were able to be maintained. Aztlan is occasionally talked about as the land that the United States took from Mexico after the Mexican–American War. De la Torre and Gutierrez imply that for this reason Aztlan was an attempt for Mexican Americans to regain lost history and identity.

The concept was first seen in El plan de Aztlan adopted at the National Chicano Youth Liberation Conference, held in Denver, Colorado in 1969. The manifesto itself was based on a poem by Alberto Alurista who pushed for it to become the central theme of the conference. The plan brought together community and cultural activists from across the southern United States. It inspired the Chicano population of America to become more aware and self-determined during their struggle for equality. Aztlan would soon become ingrained in the Chicano movement as an important political and spiritual symbol.

=== "Bandidos," folk heroes ===
The Chicano (Mexican-American) Folk Hero is born out of the conflict of the borderlands, the contentious stretch of land sitting along the U.S. Mexico border. The Bandido or Bandelora can be understand through the lens of social banditry; these are men and women who face anguish, often at the hands of Anglo-American authorities, and whom would still be considered culturally righteous despite crimes attributed to or perpetrated by them. The most famous of these figures are therefore remembered as outlaws: men like Juan Cortina, Augustine Chacon, or Gregorio Cortez, who inherit the title of bandido from their Mexican heritage and the imagery of legends such as Pancho Villa.

Chicano bandidos have been depicted in many formats, that of songs, films, murals, and plain stories. Up until recently, scholarly work was not well maintained on these depictions, but efforts by scholars such as Americo Paredes have helped to engage the academic sphere with Chicano folklore. Americo Paredes studied corridos specifically, but, the rebellious dignity of the bandido can be dated back to the Spanish Golden Age of Baroque Literature of the 16th and 17th century; Spanish playwrights such as Félix Lope de Vega y Carpio depicted the self-empowered bandelora as aggrieved women who reject society and assume a counter-role, preying upon men. Chicano folktales, however, most often drew from the likes of Francisco "Pancho" Villa, a Mexican Revolutionary figure described as the first Mexican folk hero. Coincidentally, efforts by Anglo-American media outlets to sensationalize Chicano "banditry" over the course of American history has also played a large part in the folk status of Chicano bandidos. In California, newspaper headlines warned of banditos at the height of the Gold Rush, while elsewhere they reported Texas Ranger and Chicano clashes throughout the American Borderlands. While news reports often excused the violence used by Anglo-Authorities against Chicanos, it also gave Chicano people someone to rally behind and canonize as a Folk Hero.

- Augustine Chacon
- Catarino Garza
- Gregorio Cortez
- Juan Cortina
- Juan Flores
- Tiburcio Vasquez

==== Contemporary bandidos ====
Folk Heroes continue to rise within and without the Borderlands, as political tensions between Chicano people and Anglo-American authorities likewise persists. The Chicano folk heroes of modern times are not always labeled as outlaws, but they remain bandidos in that they openly defy oppressive authority in an effort to stand for the rights of their community. These figures range from civil rights advocates like that of Dolores Huerta or Cesar Chavez, to normal people uplifted into folk legend like Felix Longoria Jr. or Selena.

- Cesar Chavez
- Dolores Huerta
- Felix Z. Longoria Jr.
- Reies Lopez Tijerina
- Rodolpho "Corky" Gonzales
- Selena

== In modern times ==
Today most of the Mexican folklore, aside from the more popular folklore stories, including La Llorona, is based in cultural identity. Folklore offers a means of reconciling split loyalties insofar as it often deals with very real problems, thus lessening tensions. This relates to tension between retaining Mexican roots and completely assimilating to the American way of life. Examples of this can be as simple as speaking English opposed to Spanish in public, or as serious as identifying as American rather than a Chicano. This inner conflict of choosing between identities can lead to a loss of culture. In today's society, many Mexican nationals traveling from Mexico to the US struggle with these problems of identification. Some folklore stories told today, for example The Bracero (Mexican Agricultural Worker), reflect this struggle of identity. This story revolves around a young Mexican man who, during WWII, came to the US for farm work under the Bracero program. Throughout the story he finds himself in awkward situations where he must act more American or more Mexican. (Though the stories themselves revolve around humorous behavior that is not culturally accurate within the context of the Bracero program.)

Folklore is also shaped by the geographical culture of those creating folklore, specifically folk stories and corridos. In the 1920's, many Mexicans began looking for work in the United States as a result of the Mexican Revolution and the growing labor demands there, which led them to create communities within cities where they found steady work in agriculture, mining, and railroads. By the mid-1920s, many Mexican communities had their own established business that were owned and operated by Mexicans. This established a clear cultural dynamic in the area that affects the folklore created by creating unique circumstances that are a blend of cultural, societal, and economic factors that influence the kind of folk stories and corridos shared. According to Americo Paredes, three distinct cultures emerged as a result of this: the truly regional groups, the rural and semi-rural groups, and the urban groups of Mexican immigrants. This distinction between groups explains the diversity and variation in folklore.

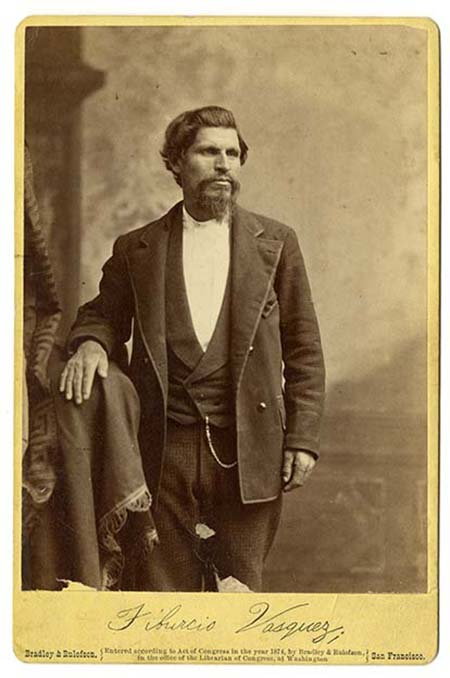

Another type of folklore that Mexican American culture presents resembles that of Robin Hood, the "social banditry" mentioned in the above Bandidos section. An example would be the story of Tiburcio Vasquez. He was regarded as a proud figure who resisted social domination and fought to maintain and preserve his culture. The story is based around his life in California where, after being involved in a murder case, he lived a life constantly on the run. Although the claim to his involvement was unfounded, he knew he wouldn't be treated justly if he returned home, so he survived as a thief. Similarly to Robin Hood, Vasquez maintained a 'steal from the rich, give to the poor' mentality, for example, “One source refers to his captives as hog tied.” Although on the run, he also flirted with many women as he moved from city to city. Considered a legend of Mexican folklore, his stories have a theme wider than entertainment or crime. They comment on resistance to unjust authority and discrimination. Stories like Vasquez's have influenced attitudes and behaviors of Mexican men and women even today. They understand stories like these bring hope to their communities when dominant social groups exercise primary control.

Over time, these stories have evolved. They may keep to the same narrative, but the use and interpretation of these stories has undoubtedly changed in modern times. A great example of this evolution is the Black Legend (Leyenda negra). This folk story gives an origin of the belief that Spanish people are inherently bad and cruel. This idea has evolved with the story itself and is now used to explains the rude way Anglo Americans treat Spanish descent people, specifically Mexican Americans. This story, or at least its name, has since been used as a reference to anti-Latino bias by the 2020 film La Leyenda Negra.

== Connection to the Chicana movement ==
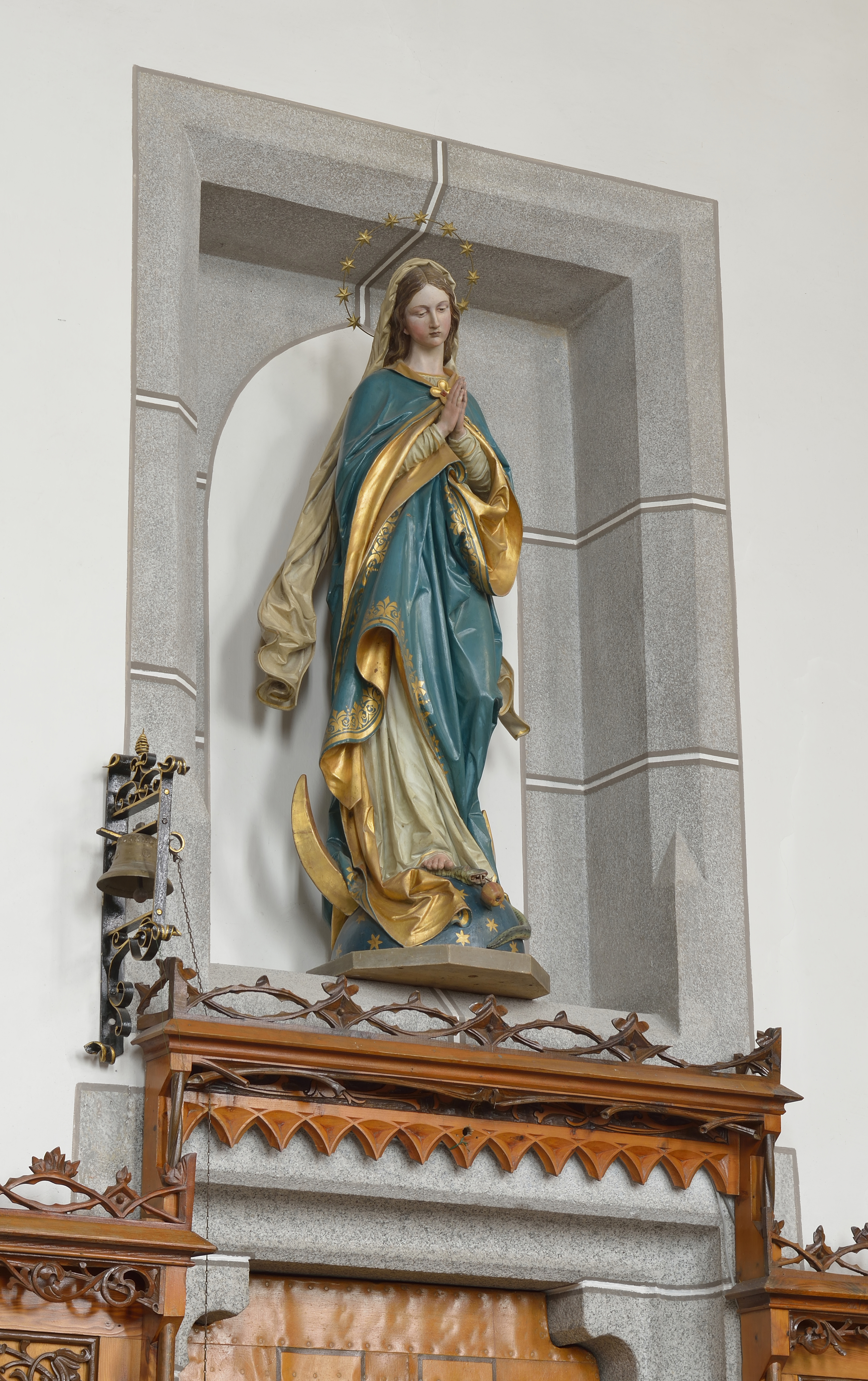

The most influential and significant figure to Mexican and Chicano women overall is the La Virgen de Guadalupe (Our Lady of Guadalupe). Known as the Virgin Mary, she represents the ideal woman in the Mexican culture. Although she is the preeminent representation of womanhood, she has since become an icon for women's subjugation and oppression. As the catholic faith is a driving force within the Mexican American community, figures like the Virgin Mary hold very high and relevant importance. More importantly, she is one of the few figures of importance to the Chicana movement that is female. Being female, the Virgin Mary can therefore connect with all Mexican American women, as seen in Ruiz's work 'From Out of the Shadows'. Some of the values upheld and reflected by the Virgin Mary include faith, strength, family, and independence. As the Chicana movement moves forward, the ability to fall back on the values of the Virgin Mary are considered and trusted to be able to overcome future barriers.

Vicki Ruiz, a professor of History and Chicano/Latino studies at the University of California Irvine, entails the way matriarchs or Mexican families pass on their values to their daughters based on those encouraged by the virgin Mary. She also comments on having the actual Virgin Mary present in the home and its importance to the entire family. Her presence in the home serves as a place of worship as well as a reminder to act accordingly. Ruiz also entails how the Guadalupe acts as a source of independence for women. Young women and girls in the Mexican American culture use this idea to grow and establish themselves outside the family and within their communities. Chicana feminist groups also use the idea of independence to separate themselves from the wave of the Chicano movement. Both look to the Guadalupe for strength and belief in their cause.
