= Index of articles related to Hispanic and Latino Americans =

This is an alphabetical index of topics related to Hispanic and Latino Americans.

== A ==
- Aztlán

== B ==
- Bisbee Deportation
- Bracero program
- Brown Berets

== C ==
- Católicos por La Raza
- Chicana feminism
- Chicanismo
- Chicano art
- Chicano Blowouts
- Chicano films
- Chicano literature
- Chicano Moratorium
- Chicano Movement
- Chicano poetry
- Chicano Park
- Chicano rock
- Chicano rap
- Cholo
- Colegio César Chávez

== E ==
- Estrada Courts murals

== L ==
- Las Gorras Blancas
- Lowrider

== M ==
- Mexican muralism
- Mexican Repatriation

== N ==
- New Mexican cuisine
- New Mexico music

== O ==
- Operation Wetback

== P ==
- Pachuco
- Paño
- Plan de Santa Bárbara
- Plan Espiritual de Aztlán
- Proposition 187

== S ==
- Skull art
- Sleepy Lagoon murder

== T ==
- Teatro Campesino
- Tejano music
- Tex-Mex cuisine
- Tortilla art

== Z ==
- Zoot suit
- Zoot Suit Riots
