= Alurista =

American poet and activist

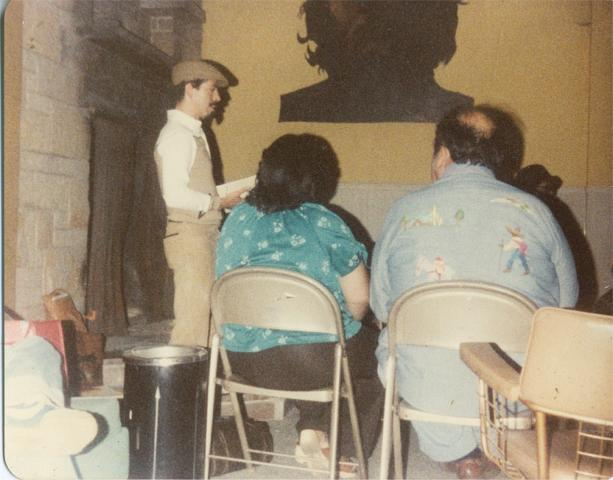
- Alurista gives a reading at Colegio Cesar Chavez in Mt. Angel, Oregon, circa 1981.
- Born: Alberto Baltazar Urista Heredia; August 8, 1947 (age 79); Mexico City, Mexico
- Occupations: Poet, activist
- Writing career
- Literary movement: Aztlán

Alberto Baltazar Urista Heredia (born August 8, 1947), better known by his nom de plume Alurista, is a Mexican poet and activist. His work was influential in the Chicano Movement and is important to the field of Chicano poetry.

== Early life and education ==
Urista was born in Mexico City and attended primary school in Morelos. He went to the United States when he was thirteen, settling with his family in the border city of San Diego, California. He graduated from high school in 1965 and began studying business administration at Chapman University in Orange County, California. He disliked the field, however, and transferred to San Diego State University (SDSU) to study religion. He changed his major several times before earning a B.A. in psychology in 1970. He went on to earn an M.A. from SDSU in 1978, and his PhD in literature from the University of California-San Diego in 1983. His doctoral thesis was on the fiction of Chicano lawyer and author Oscar Zeta Acosta. He has taught at California Polytechnic State University in San Luis Obispo, California, Escuela Tlatelolco in Denver, Colorado, and at the University of Texas at Austin. He has also lectured and read his poetry in venues throughout the world.

== Poetry ==
Urista's first experience writing poetry was as a student in Mexico, when he began writing love poems for his classmates as a way to earn money. He began writing poetry for publication in 1966. In 1967, he co-founded the SDSU chapter of MEChA, the Movimiento Estudiantil Chicano de Aztlán, ("Chicano Student Movement of Aztlán") and organized students in favor of the United Farm Workers grape boycott. He held several jobs, including working for the Volunteers in Service to America (VISTA) program, part of the Lyndon B. Johnson administration's War on Poverty.

In 1969, he attended the First National Chicano Youth Liberation Conference, hosted by Rodolfo "Corky" Gonzales's Crusade for Justice, and read a poem to the attendees. The poem so moved the youth present that they adopted it as the preamble of the Plan Espiritual de Aztlán, the political manifesto of the Chicano Movement. Upon returning to San Diego, he helped to establish the Chicano Studies department at SDSU.

During the mid-1990s, he traveled and performed with the Taco Shop Poets. However, he has expressed disapproval of the new, Hip hop-influenced style of Chicano poetry. Regarding a poetry slam hosted by the Movimiento de Arte y Cultura Latino Americana (MACLA), he said, "That's not Chicano poetry, [...] It's nice that they're doing it, but it's not part of the tradition of Chicano literature."

== Activism ==
As an active member of the San Diego-area Chicano Movement, Urista was instrumental in the 1970 takeover of Chicano Park and in the foundation of the Centro Cultural de la Raza, a cultural center. It was at this time that he began using the name "Alurista". The assumption of a pen name was as much for anonymity as it was for artistry. According to Urista, "My apartment was shot up by the Minutemen. I didn't want these people to be able to associate my last name with my family, so I changed it." However, the name change was also a reflection of his Marxist philosophy: "The notion was to synthesize--to bring things together. So I tried to do that with my name."

In the 1970s, Alurista organized the Festival Floricanto, an annual event that convened Chicano writers and critics to share and critique their work.

In addition to his own poetry, Alurista has written works of non-fiction, literary criticism, and many essays on Chicano culture and history. He is credited with popularizing the Chicano Movement-era concept of "Aztlán" and imbuing it with a spiritual dimension through his poetry. His Spanish-language writings were among the first by an American to be taken seriously by critics from hispanophone countries. In the United States, he was one of the first critically acclaimed poets to mix the Spanish and English languages.

== Personal life ==
Alurista has been married twice and has four children. He spent the years 1995 – 1998 in a "spiritual meandering", about which he said, "Being an artist is not all creativity. There are periods of self-destructiveness. You internalize things that destroy you. You end up blaming others for your pain--whatever or whoever those 'others' happen to be--which makes you a resentful person. That resentment turns inward, and you end up eating yourself up." In 1998, after family problems and rumors of substance abuse, Alurista left his longtime home of San Diego for San Jose, California, attracted by its active cultural arts scene.

Spiritually, Urista identifies as both a Buddhist and a Roman Catholic, as well as acknowledging indigenous practices such as the sweat lodge. Politically, he identifies himself as a "...socialist. With a definite Mayan bent to everything."

== Religion ==
Alurista identifies as both a Buddhist and a Roman Catholic. He admires Catholicism for its rituals, and Buddhism for its meditative practices. He says that he also engages in Native American practices, and is "connected to [his] Father Sun and Mother Earth and [his] brothers and sisters, trees and ants and what not.. [he's] able to do things that show [him] that everything is connected, man."

== Awards ==
Alurista has received numerous awards and has made his mark in the Chicano community. He has read his poetry all over the world, from Mexico, to the United States, to Europe. He was also producer and subject of the video, "Torn in Two", which featured four Chicano poets. The video aired in 1984 and won an Emmy. Alurista's work is being collected in the "Mexican American Archives at the Benson Collection: A Guide for Users", University of Texas, Austin. He is a professor and scholar, having obtained his Ph.D. in Spanish and Latin American literature, he was awarded the Jr. MacArthur Chair in Spanish by Colorado College in 1984 for his teaching excellence. He is the cofounder of multiple academic and community organizations, such as Movimiento Estudiantil Chicano de Aztlan at San Diego State, Concilio for la Justicia, Centro Cultural de la Raza, and the Department of Chicano Studies at San Diego State University. His papers are held at University of Texas, Austin and at California Ethnic and Multicultural Archives.

== Bibliography ==
- Nationchild plumaroja, 1969-1972. San Diego: Toltecas en Aztlan, Centro Cultural de la Raza, 1972.
- Cantares arrullos. Jamaica, New York: Bilingual Press, 1975.
- Festival de flor y Canto: an anthology of Chicano literature (editor). Los Angeles: University of Southern California Press, 1976. ISBN 0-88474-031-5
- Timespace huracan : poems, 1972-1975. Albuquerque, N.M. : Pajarito Publications, 1976.
- Spik in Glyph?. Houston, Texas: Arte Público Press, 1981. ISBN 0-934770-09-3
- Return: Poems Collected and New. Ypsilanti, Michigan: Bilingual Press, 1982. ISBN 0-916950-24-7
- Chicanos : the second largest minority in the USA (with R. Müller-Kind). Werther: Views Verlag, 1988.
- Z Eros. Tempe, Arizona: Bilingual Press/Editorial Bilingüe, 1995. ISBN 0-927534-45-2.
- Et Tu... Raza?. Tempe, Arizona: Bilingual Press/Editorial Bilingüe, 1996. ISBN 0-927534-48-7.
- As our barrio turns: who the yoke b on?. San Diego: Calaca Press, 2000. ISBN 0-9660773-3-4.
- Tunaluna. San Antonio, TX: Aztlan Libre Press, 2010. ISBN 0-9844415-0-6.
- ZAZ San Jose, CA: FlowerSong Press, 2020. ISBN 978-1-953447-91-3.

== See also ==
- List of Mexican American writers
- Latino poetry
- Chicano poetry
- American literature in Spanish
- Ana Castillo
- Sandra Cisneros
