= The Islands of the Blessed =

2009 novel by Nancy Farmer

- Front cover of first edition
- Author: Nancy Farmer
- Language: English
- Series: Sea of Trolls series
- Genre: Children's fantasy novel
- Publisher: Atheneum Books
- Publication date: October 20, 2009
- Publication place: United States
- Media type: Print (hardcover)
- Pages: 496 pp
- ISBN: 1-4169-0737-8
- Preceded by: The Land of the Silver Apples

The Islands of the Blessed is a fantasy novel for children, written by Nancy Farmer and published by Atheneum in 2009. It is the third, and so far the last, in the Sea of Trolls series, which is named for its first book (2004).

== Content ==
Jack, the young Saxon bard, and Thorgil, the Viking shield maiden, deal with the draugr, an undead sea creature, who leaves a path of destruction around her in her quest for revenge on Father Severus. Their journey takes them to the mysterious realm of Notland and, ultimately, to the Islands of the Blessed.

== Sequel ==
In her blog Nancy Farmer mentions a possible sequel but says she is writing a sequel to The House of the Scorpion first.

As of May 2015 no further information has surfaced.

== Characters ==
Jack- Age thirteen; an apprentice bard.

Hazel- Jack's sister; age eight; stolen and raised by Hobgoblins.

Thorgil Silverhand-Jack's friend, a shield maiden crippled after an encounter with a demon, who now lives with his family

Lucy- Jack's foster sister; lost to elfland.

Aldiltha- Jack's mother; a wise woman.

Giles Crookleg- Jack's father.

The Bard- A druid from Ireland; also known as Dragon Tongue, who possesses great wisdom, and serves as Jack's teacher

Eithne- Daughter of the elf queen and The Bard.

Pega- An ex-slave girl; age fifteen.

Father Severus-A grim monk rescued from elfland

Brother Aiden-One of the few surviving monks from Lindisfarne, the Holy Isle

The Draugr-The malevolent spirit of a mermaid with a grudge against Father Severus
