= A Girl Named Disaster =

1996 novel by Nancy Farmer

- Author: Nancy Farmer
- Cover artist: Deborah Kaplan and Robert Hunt
- Language: English
- Genre: Children's novel
- Publisher: Orchard Books
- Publication date: September 1996
- Publication place: United States
- Media type: Print (hardback & paperback)
- Pages: 320 pp (first edition, hardback)
- ISBN: 0-531-09539-8 (first edition, hardback)
- OCLC: 34513315

A Girl Named Disaster is a 1996 novel written by Nancy Farmer. The book explores the qualities needed to survive in a hostile environment (particularly by a woman), coming-of-age, and the availability of spiritual guidance.

The book has been well-received. In 1997, it won the Newbery Honor for the novel, landed on the American Library Association's list of Top Ten Books for Young Adults, and was a finalist for the National Book Award for Young People's Literature.

== Plot ==
Nhamo is an 11-year-old girl living in a traditional Shona village located in Mozambique around 1981. She was raised with the knowledge and customs of her tribe. Nhamo means "disaster" in the Shona language. Nhamo was given this name because of the scandal and wrongful things continued to follow her and her mother. After experiencing trouble with a cholera epidemic, a leopard, and an arranged marriage proposed by a false witch doctor, she flees with her dying grandmother's blessings, some gold nuggets, and her meager survival skills. Nhamo steals a boat and supplies under her grandmother's instructions and uses the river as her road to Zimbabwe, where she faces the threat of hippos, crocodiles, and other animals trying to kill her, while dealing with the pressures of becoming a woman.

What should have been a two-day boat trip across the border to her father's family in Zimbabwe spans a year in which Nhamo faces starvation and the threat of hungry or aggressive animals. The girl finds her way to a lush, haunted island and lives alongside a troop of baboons. Daily conversations with spirits combat Nhamo's loneliness and provide her with sage and practical advice. She makes mistakes, loses heart, and nearly dies of starvation. Even after she arrives in Zimbabwe where she lives with scientists before meeting her father's family, Nhamo must learn how to live in a modern society (clothing, behavior, literacy), and is urged to let go of the "evil" spirits that "possess" her as prescribed by a Muvuki or witch finder.

== Characters ==
- Nhamo Jongwe: The girl named "Disaster". She got her name due to the many disasters she faces during her life, even as a child. However, Nhamo is resourceful and clever, in spite of the bad luck she supposedly causes.
- Aunt Chipo: Nhamo's bad tempered aunt, who has resented Runako, Nhamo's deceased mother and Chipo's older sister, since they were children. She has hated Nhamo and her mother ever since she was born and forces her to do most of the work in the village, allowing her daughter, Masvita, to do the less strenuous tasks.
- Masvita: Nhamo's sweet tempered cousin, who behaves respectfully towards Nhamo, in spite of how mean-spirited her mother is.
- Aunt Shuvai: Nhamo's younger aunt. She is considerably more ambivalent to Nhamo.
- Uncle Kufa: Nhamo's uncle and Aunt Chipo's husband. He is a pragmatic man.
- Ruva: Aunt Chipo′s second daughter.
- Ambuya: Nhamo and Masvita's grandmother. She treats Nhamo with respect and loves her dearly, and is one of the few people to do so. Chipo resents her mother, believing that Ambuya favoured Runako (Nhamo's mother) for doing well in school and Shuvai, who was the youngest of Ambuya's three daughters.
- Crocodile Guts: A fisherman
- Sister Gladys: A nurse who takes care of Nhamo in the later part of the book.
- Goré Mtoko : A man who was killed by Nhamo's father
- Muvuki: the witch finder
- Rumpy: A baboon with no tail that is constantly bullied by other baboons. He tried to bully Nhamo while she was on the island, and later was killed.

== See also ==
- The Ear, the Eye and the Arm
