= MEChA =

American organization

One common feature of logos used by M.E.Ch.A. chapters, an Eagle holding a lit stick of dynamite and a macuahuitl.

M.E.Ch.A. (Spanish: Movimiento Estudiantil Chicano de Aztlán, lit. 'Chicano Student Movement of Aztlán') is a US-based organization that seeks to promote Chicano unity and empowerment through political action.

== Origins in the 1960s ==
MEChA began during the 1960s, empowered through the political movements of the time, especially the civil rights and Chicano Movement. The group coalesced out of several organizations which had formed during that turbulent decade. In 1969, students from twelve universities met at a conference in Santa Barbara, California, and called for a unification of all student and youth organizations into one organization, MEChA. The Denver, Colorado–based Crusade for Justice, a civil rights and educational organization founded in the mid-1960s, concerned itself with the problems of the city's Chicano youth. One of the founding documents, "El Plan Espiritual de Aztlán", was drafted during this conference. This document reflects the sentiment of the Latino/Chicano youth during an era of a turbulent social climate (especially in the wake of violence experienced by Latino youth from the US military and police during the Zoot Suit Riots).

The Mexican American Youth Organization was founded in San Antonio, Texas in 1967. It employed the tactics of the Student Nonviolent Coordinating Committee and later spurred the creation of the La Raza Unida Party.

The Brown Berets were a youth organization that agitated against police brutality in East Los Angeles. In 1968, they helped the United Mexican American Students (UMAS), Sal Castro, and other youth who met at the Piranya Cafe organize the East L.A. walkouts, called the Blowouts, a series of protests against unfair conditions in Los Angeles schools.

Following the Blowouts, a group of students, school administrators, and teachers formed the Chicano Coordinating Committee on Higher Education (CCCHE), a network to pressure the adoption and expansion of equal opportunity programs in California's colleges.

Rene Nuñez, an activist from San Diego who participated in the 1968 walkouts, conceived a conference to unify the student groups under the auspices of the CCCHE. This conference led to the founding of MEChA along with a basic Chicano Studies curriculum plan called “El Plan”.

In April 1969, Chicano college students held a nationwide conference at the University of California, Santa Barbara (UCSB). Many of the attendees were present at the First National Chicano Youth Liberation Conference hosted by Rodolfo "Corky" Gonzales' Crusade for Justice a month prior, and the Santa Barbara conference represented the extension of the Chicano Youth Movement into the realm of higher education.

The name "Movimiento Estudiantil Chicano de Aztlán" was already in use by a few groups, and the name was adopted by the conference attendees because of the importance of each of the words and as a means of transcending the regional nature of the multiple campus-based groups. Conference attendees also set the national agenda and drafted the Plan de Santa Bárbara, a pedagogic manifesto.

MEChA chapters first took root on California college campuses and then expanded to high schools and schools in other states.

== Organizational structure ==
=== Affiliated chapters ===
MEChA exists as over 400 loosely affiliated chapters within a national organization. Typical activities of a MEChA chapters include educational & social activities, such as academic tutoring, mentorship, folklore and poetry recitals, exploring the way of life through an indigenous perspective bringing Chicano speakers to their campus, high school outreach, attending Statewide, Regional, & National Conferences. Many chapters are also involved in political actions, such as lobbying high school and university administrators for expanded Bilingual Education programs and Chicano-related curricula, the celebration of Mexican cultural traditions, as well as other Latin American holidays (such as Mexican Independence Day), Columbus Day protests, sit-ins, hunger strikes, boycotts, rallies, marches and other political activism relating to civil rights, affirmative action, and immigration.

=== National MEChA Constitution ===
The National MEChA constitution was ratified on April 9, 1995 during the second annual National MEChA conference at the University of California, Berkeley (Cal). The document outlines four objectives:

- Educational, cultural, economical, political, and social empowerment of Chicanos.
- Retention of Chicano identity and furthering of cultural awareness.
- Uplifting and mobilizing Chicanos and Chicanas through higher education.
- Implementing plans of action concerning Chicanos and Chicanas.

Since its adoption, the document has been amended five times:

- Amended on April 14, 1996 at University of Texas, Pan American
- Amended on April 14, 1997 at Michigan State University (MSU)
- Amended on March 18, 2001 at San Diego State University (SDSU)
- Amended on March 30, 2003 at University of California, Berkeley
- Amended on May 30, 2010 at University of Washington, Seattle

During the 1999 National Conference at Phoenix College, MEChA adopted a document entitled The Philosophy of MEChA which affirmed the more moderate view that "all people are potential Chicanas and Chicanos", and that "Chicano identity is not a nationality but a philosophy". In addition, The Philosophy of MEChA addressed the problem of outside organizations co-opting the legitimacy of MEChA to advance their own agendas, doing so by establishing guidelines to make local MEChA chapters more accountable to the national organization.

== Geography ==
In 1969, MEChA was founded in Santa Barbara, California where Chicanos adopted "El Plan de Santa Barbara." The manifesto provided a strategy to establish Chicano Studies Departments within colleges and universities. By consolidating students' political power, MEChA became a significant on-campus political force and the name signified a position to challenge social injustices and to reject assimilation through radical activism on-campus and in the community.

While the student-led organization formed in California, MEChA became a national organization with chapters in junior middle schools, high schools, community colleges, and universities. Yet MEChA's geographic expansion was rather uneven. From 1969 to 1971, MEChA grew rapidly in California with major centers of activism on campuses in Los Angeles, Santa Barbara, San Diego, and the Riverside-San Bernardino area. Other early chapters were also established in Washington, Oregon, Arizona, Colorado, and Indiana. In these years, new chapters were founded at universities and colleges exclusively. The activist Maria Luisa Alanis Ruiz joined the Oregon chapter while a student as part of her life as both an activist and academic in Chicana feminism.

By the early 1970s, a few MEChA chapters were founded in the East but mainly at Ivy League schools such as Harvard, Yale, and Brown University. MEChA largely remained a West coast organization. Expanding further in the 1980s, MEChA chapters began to appear in community colleges and high schools, but again predominantly in California and especially Southern California.

The organization did not catch on in Texas. A Mexican American Student Organization (MASO) was active at the University of Texas from 1967 until at least 1972 and students at St. Mary's College in San Antonio joined MAYO but there are no signs of MEChA chapters or other student groups in Texas until the mid-1980s.

As for Florida and other southern states, There are found no information about any chapters in this part of the country despite the growing Mexican American presence on campuses and in the region's cities. But if MEChA's geography was limited, its ability to survive and expand in California and other western states was remarkable. Student organizations rarely last very long. But MEChA has expanded each decade.

During the 1990s, MEChA experienced a decade of slow growth yet in the 2000s the organization saw an incredible upsurge of new chapters. High schools students led the charge predominantly within California and likely attributed to the anti-immigration (H.R. 4437) legislation proposed in the mid-2000s. Much like when MEChA was established, student mobilization has propelled and maintained the organization relevant for nearly fifty years.

MEChA was one of the many organizations and groups that sponsored the Cinco de Mayo movement, the others included the Chicano student groups that were on campus and the community. The Cinco de Mayo movement was one of many big cultural events.

== Criticism ==
In 2008, a passage from MEChA's national website read: 'As Chicanas and Chicanos of Aztlán, we are a nationalist movement of Indigenous Gente that lay claim to the land that is ours by birthright. As a nationalist movement we seek to free our people from the exploitation of an oppressive society that occupies our land. Thus, the principle of nationalism serves to preserve the cultural traditions of La Familia de La Raza and promotes our identity as a Chicana/Chicano Gente.' Such statements have led MEChA to be criticized by right-wing sources, including the National Review and Michelle Malkin which alleges that MEChA is tinged with racist and separatist views. The Times Online has referred to MEChA as "a radical Mexican student organisation" in describing the associations of 2003 California gubernatorial candidate Cruz Bustamante.

Critics also point out the group's use of the word Aztlán: To many, this word calls to mind a once real region comprising much of the Southwestern United States and as a result, some critics feel use of the phrase implies support for the controversial theory of reconquista. While MEChA supporters point out that the Aztlan mythology itself does not refer to reclaiming conquered lands, it simply describes the home of the Aztec people.

Critics of MECha regard the phrase "Por La Raza todo, Fuera de La Raza nada" as ethnocentric and racist. This phrase appears in El Plan Espiritual de Aztlán as the official "slogan" of MEChA. MEChA members themselves differ in their interpretations of "La Raza". While some use the term to strictly refer to only mestizos and Chicanos, others use it to mean all Hispanics and minorities. A possible origin of the phrase is the Cuban Revolution, which used the similar slogan "Por la revolución todo, fuera de la revolución nada!" According to the official MEChA website, the organization "does not exclude membership based on socio-economic status, gender, race, or orientation."

A 1998 MEChA youth conference at California Polytechnic State University (Cal Poly SLO) featured a printed program that introduced the school as "Cal Poly State Jewniversity". The program also referred to New York as "Jew York". When the Anti-Defamation League objected to the program, the Cal Poly MEChA organization issued a formal apology, a repudiation of the antisemitism and expelled those students who had been responsible for the production of the printed conference program.

The National Council of La Raza has distanced itself from MEChA due to controversial allegations made by some of its members. In a public press release, NCLR declared, "NCLR freely acknowledges that some of the organization's founding documents, e.g., Plan Espiritual de Aztlán, contain inappropriate rhetoric, and NCLR also acknowledges that rhetoric from some MEChA members has been extremist and inflammatory... NCLR has publicly and repeatedly disavowed this rhetoric". However, the NCLR emphasized that MEChA's mission statement is to support Latino students at institutions of higher education. In reference to the rhetoric included in the Plan Espiritual de Aztlán, the NCLR quoted journalist Gustavo Arellano who commented in a Los Angeles Times op-ed article,"few members take these dated relics of the 1960s seriously, if they even bothered to read them." Within the article, Arellano also noted that all of the MEChA members of his class graduated from college and have gone on to successful careers, a rarity at a time when only 12% of Latinos have a college degree.

== Incidents ==
- In May 1995, Voz Fronteriza, a publication of the MEChA chapter at the University of California, San Diego published an editorial entitled "Death of a Migra Pig," which celebrated the recent death of Luis A. Santiago, a Latino Immigration and Naturalization Service (INS) officer who died in the line of duty. The editorial stated that Santiago was a "traitor...to his race," and that "We're glad this pig died, he deserved to die," and argued, "All the Migra pigs should be killed, every single one...the only good one is a dead one...The time to fight back is now. It is time to organize an anti-Migra patrol...It is to [sic] bad that more Migra pigs didn't die with him." The article generated public outrage, and Congressman Duncan L. Hunter threatened to pursue legislation that would eliminate federal funding for UCSD. UCSD defended the paper's right to publish the editorial, arguing that it was protected by Freedom of Speech.
- On May 11, 1993, Chicano students at University of California, Los Angeles (UCLA) caused damage to the Faculty Center estimated between $35,000 to $50,000 during a riot which ensued following the university administration's rejection of the creation of a Chicano Studies program, an announcement that was made on the eve of César Chávez's funeral. Following this incident, MEChA students organized peaceful demonstrations at UCLA, including a 14-day hunger strike which garnered support from several California state leaders and ultimately resulted in the establishment of The César Chávez Center.
- In February 2002, MEChA members were accused of theft of an entire press run of a particular issue of the UC Berkeley conservative newspaper California Patriot which was featuring an article that labelled MEChA a "neo-Nazi"-like organization. Police reported that over 3,000 copies (valued at $1,500 - $2,000) were stolen during a break-in at the Patriot office in Eshleman Hall. The issue of the paper included an article, entitled "MEChA: Student Funded Bigotry and Hate," blames the group for impeding "advances in civil rights toward a colorblind American society" through "anti-American hate" and "a mentality that leads its adherents to believe anyone who is white and male is to blame for any historical injustice." The article written by the California Patriot staff, which Time magazine described as reveling in their roles as provocateurs, included controversial remarks made by a separate organization that were falsely attributed to MEChA. MEChA denied any involvement in the incidents and "condemns harassment," said Livia Rojas, a leader in the group. The case was ultimately dropped as insufficient evidence was found to implicate any suspects.
- On May 18, 2006, nearly 2,000 copies (of a total run of 5,000 copies) of The Courier were removed from newspaper boxes on the Pasadena City College campus, torn in half, and returned to the paper's campus office with a signed note claiming responsibility. The letter expressed disappointment for the lack of coverage provided for a MEChA-hosted event on May 12, 2006, which had involved "months of hard work". It ended stating: "As students of P.C.C., we can not accept this issue of the Campus Courier." Student leaders of MEChA on campus maintained that the group as a whole was not responsible for the incident. A subsequent investigation determined that the theft had been committed by an individual MEChA member who admitted to acting alone. The student was ordered by the college to serve community service hours and repay the costs for the damaged issues. The Courier's advisor said that there was no lingering animosity between the paper and MEChA and that leaders from both organizations had met to discuss the incident.

== Name change ==
At the 2010 National Conference in Seattle, the name of the organization was changed to Movimiento Estudiantil Chican@ de Aztlán.

At the 2016 National MEChA Conference in Tucson, AZ; the name of the Organization was changed to Movimiento Estudiantil Chicanx de Aztlán.

In April 2019, student leaders voted to drop "Chicano" and "Aztlán" from the group name. This was done in response to a conversation concerning whether the words are homophobic, anti-black, and anti-indigenous. Latino USA from NPR reports that "the online reactions following the name change reflect the strong reactions as the organization heralds in a new generation of leaders."
