= The Sea of Trolls =

Novel by Nancy Farmer

- Front cover of first edition
- Author: Nancy Farmer
- Language: English
- Genre: Young adult, children's fiction and fantasy
- Publisher: Atheneum Books
- Publication date: September 2004
- Publication place: United States
- Media type: Print (hardcover & paperback)
- Pages: 459 pp (first edition, hardcover)
- ISBN: 978-0-689-86744-6 (first)
- OCLC: 53840061
- LC Class: PZ7.F23814 Se 2004
- Followed by: The Land of the Silver Apples

The Sea of Trolls is a fantasy novel for children, written by American author Nancy Farmer and published by Atheneum in 2004. It is the first volume in a series, which Farmer continued in 2007 and 2009.

== Summary ==
The Sea of Trolls is set in Anglo-Saxon England, Scandinavia, and the mythical realm of Jötunheimr.

Saxon farmboy Jack becomes the apprentice of The Bard, who tells him the tale of Beowulf, claiming to have aided Beowulf in fighting Grendel's mother, a shapeshifting half-troll named Frothi. However, Frothi's sister Frith sent The Dragon to kill Beowulf in revenge, and her husband, the Northman King Ivar the Boneless, set The Bard adrift. The Bard eventually came to Jack's village, but as he continues training Jack in song and magic, Jack finds a box of bog-myrtle, used by Northman berserkers, a sign Frith's warriors have come to Saxon. The village learns from a wounded monk that the berserkers destroyed the Holy Isle and retreat into the woods at the behest of The Bard, while he and Jack hide them all by calling fog. The Bard gives Jack an invisible rune of protection, but this leaves him vulnerable to a Nightmare ridden by Frith's spirit that renders him insane. Jack returns home, only to find his family returned after his sister Lucy complained about the fog. Jack attempts to continue calling the fog, but he and Lucy are captured by the berserkers, led by Olaf One-Brow.

The pair are to be sold as slaves to "Picts" as soon as they reach land, where Jack learns the boy who captured Lucy, Thorgil, is a shield-maiden aspiring to become a berserker. Though both Jack and Lucy are desired by the Picts, Olaf convinces Thorgil to give Lucy to Frith instead, while Jack demonstrates his singing to convince Olaf to keep him as a personal bard. After a demonstration of his magic to calm the sea by calling fog, Jack also summons a nearby crow, who he names Bold Heart. After Jack clears the fog by accidentally causing a rainstorm that ruins most of the Northmens' supplies, Olaf brings him to witness a berserker raid on an enemy village with the intention of providing Jack with material for a praise-song, but Jack is repulsed by the violence and almost driven to suicide. Olaf's previous skald, Rune, offers his own verses to aid Jack, knowing that like the Bard, who the Northmen know as "Dragon Tongue", Jack will be unable to honestly praise Olaf,

When they arrive at Olaf's village nothing goes as planned. Jack is sentenced to menial labor and made to clean the barn. There Jack encounters the deadly troll-pig, Golden Bristles, who is to be sacrificed to the goddess Freya by being placed in a wooden cart and left to sink in a bog, though Jack is able to befriend the pig with his singing. Thorgil gives Lucy to Frith, but is denied admission into the berserkers, and though Jack's singing Olaf's praise-song for the Northman's homecoming is well-received, Frith demands Jack as well. Jack offers to sing Frith's praises instead, though he accidentally casts a spell that removes Frith's hair and enrages the queen. As the Northmen retreat, Jack frees Golden Bristles, only for Frith to threaten to sacrifice Lucy instead if Jack is unable to restore her hair. Though Jack lacks the knowledge, Rune suggests he can gain it from Mimir's Well in Jötunheim, and Frith grudgingly provides them with a gold chess piece she stole from her mother, the Mountain Queen, to ensure their safe passage.

Jack and the Northmen travel across the Sea of Trolls to enter Jötunheim, where Jack, Thorgil, Olaf and Bold Heart disembark. During their travels, Thorgil continues to argue with both Jack and Olaf, attracting the attention of a troll-bear. Olaf and Thorgil enter a berserker rage to battle it, but Bold Heart breaks his wing distracting the bear, Thorgil breaks her ankle and Olaf is mortally wounded, but kills the troll-bear. After Jack gives Olaf a funeral, Jack and Thorgil are captured by a dragon, but Bold Heart tricks the dragon and enables Jack and Thorgil to escape. Thorgil slays a dragonlet but gets some blood on her tongue, allowing her to speak with birds and lead them to an enchanted valley to recover, where Jack slowly befriends Thorgil and reunites with Golden Bristles.

Jack, Thorgil, Bold Heart and Golden Bristles eventually reach the halls of the Mountain Queen, meeting Frith's half-sisters Fonn and Forath. Glamdis, the Mountain Queen, permits Jack and Thorgil to attend the Norns' chess game, where the Norns reveal the World Tree Yggdrasil and Mimir's Well are in the valley. As the well requires a sacrifice to drink from, Thorgil offers her own life to allow Jack to drink, but is spurned, and nevertheless attempts suicide. Jack rescues her by giving her the rune of protection, robbing her of her suicidal desires and berserker tendencies and fulfilling the conditions for them both to drink from the well. Jack also spares some song-mead for Rune, reasoning the sacrifice of his voice prior and his greatest poem fulfilled the conditions.

Upon their return to Ivar's court, Jack gives the song-mead to Rune, restoring his voice, and explains to Frith that she needs to cut off one third of the hair from her troll-cats to restore her hair and lie in it under the full moon. However, Frith doesn't listen and cuts all of the cats' hair off: as a result, Frith's hair grows everywhere not just back on her head, transforming her into a monstrous form. Thorgil frees the enraged troll-cats, who chase Thorgil into Freya's fen.

Jack and Lucy are freed, and Olaf's eldest son Skakki commands Olaf's ship and takes Jack and Lucy back to their village. On the way, Thorgil demonstrates her new talent for poetry by composing Jack and Jill based on their encounter with Mimir's Well, while Rune gives Jack a few spare drops of song-mead. Jack and Lucy return to the village, where Jack hopes to cure The Bard's insanity with the song-mead, but Bold Heart attacks The Bard and stops his heart, though Jack successfully resuscitates him with the song-mead. The Bard reveals he had traded spirits with Bold Heart to watch over Jack, and he and Jack discuss their shared adventure.

== Characters ==
- Jack: The main protagonist. A farmboy taken on as an apprentice by The Bard, and kidnapped by the Northmen.
- The Bard/Dragon Tongue: Jack's mentor, an Irish magician who chronicled the exploits of Beowulf and served at the court of Ivar the Boneless.
- Lucy: Jack's younger sister, who believes herself to be an adopted princess.
- Thorgil: A half-Saxon shield-maiden, daughter of a Saxon slave and the greatest berserker of Olaf's village, Thorgrim.
- Olaf-One Brow: A massive Northman, leader of the raiding team that captures Jack and Lucy, and currently the best berserker of his village.
- Rune: Olaf's former skald, who lost his voice in battle, and becomes a mentor to Jack.
- Bold Heart: A crow missing a toe who accompanies Jack.
- Frith: A half-troll, and Queen of Ivar's court, who uses enchanted hair to appear as a beautiful woman.
- Ivar the Boneless: Frith's husband, king of Olaf's village.
- Glamdis: The Mountain Queen, and Frith's mother, who hosts the chess games played by the Norns.
- Fonn: Glamdis' daughter, who attends to Jack and Thorgil.
- Golden Bristles: A troll-boar who was captured by Olaf and befriended by Jack.

== See also ==
- Jötunn
- List of Germanic deities
- Norns
- Beowulf
- Ivar the Boneless
