= The Lord of Opium =

2013 novel by Nancy Farmer

The Lord Of Opium
- Front cover of The Lord Of Opium.
- Author: Nancy Farmer
- Cover artist: Mike Rosamilia
- Language: English
- Genre: Young adult, Science fiction novel
- Publisher: Atheneum Books
- Publication date: 2013
- Publication place: United States
- Media type: Print (hardback & paperback)
- Pages: 405 pp
- ISBN: 978-1-4424-8254-8
- OCLC: 2012030418
- Dewey Decimal: [Fic]-DC23
- LC Class: PZ7.F23814Lor2013
- Preceded by: The House of the Scorpion

The Lord Of Opium is a 2013 science fiction novel by Nancy Farmer and is the sequel to the 2002 novel The House of the Scorpion. The book was first published on September 3, 2013, by Atheneum Books and follows the ongoing adventures of Matteo "Matt" Alacran. Largely centered around Matt's new regime in Opium, it explores the temptation of absolute power and Matt's struggle to not become the same type of ruler as the original El Patrón. As a 15-year-old boy, once a victim of hatred and disdain, he now finds himself in a position of wealth, power, and complete control over people.

== Synopsis ==
Raised as a clone of El Patrón, the ruler of the land of Opium, the 14-year-old Matt is not entirely ready to fill the shoes of his predecessor. The daily struggles of ruling are made even more difficult by the desperation of the people living in the lands surrounding his own; an ecological disaster has ravaged them almost to the point of no return. His enemies are many, but Matt finds himself equally afraid of his own potential to become every bit as bloodthirsty and ruthless as the tyrant from whom he was cloned.

== Production ==
The novel is partly inspired by Farmer's experience of rescuing a Mexican immigrant from dying in the desert. As The House of the Scorpion drew on so much of her childhood, Farmer found The Lord of Opium difficult to write. Farmer stated that she had never intended to create a sequel to The House of the Scorpion, as writing the novel had depressed her. As a result, she began work on the Trolls Trilogy, but soon found that she wanted to revisit the world of the previous novel to resolve problems that remained at the end of Scorpion. Farmer began working on the story in 2008 and the working title was God's Ashtray. Farmer wrote 80 pages of the book before having to stop due to an illness. When her health was better, Farmer tried to resume writing, but was exhausted after moving from California to Arizona. She was at last revived by listening to music and was able to finish the novel.

== Reception ==
Critical reception of The Lord of Opium has been favorable, with starred reviews in Publishers' Weekly, which hailed it as a "superb novel ...well worth the wait," and Booklist, which described it as "a brilliantly realized world," and "a stellar sequel." Kathleen Beck, in VOYA, judged the story "stronger and more cohesive, the moral questions more subtle than in House Of The Scorpion." Even those reviewers who did not admire the book as much as its predecessor, found it an enjoyable read. Commonsensemedia gave The Lord of Opium four out of five stars, stating that the "Sci-fi sequel is gripping but can't top original." Jonathan Hunt reviewed the novel for both the School Library Journal and The Horn Book magazine, and noted that the "landscape of dystopian literature has changed significantly since the first book, but this sequel is still a cut above the rest."
