= Rodolfo Gonzales =

Mexican American boxer, poet, and political activist

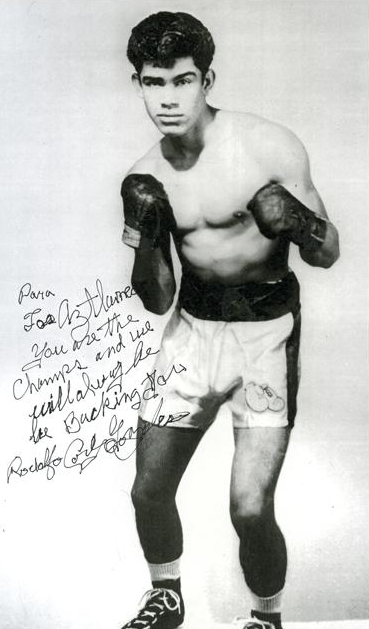
- Gonzales c. 1952

Personal information
- Nickname: Corky
- Nationality: American
- Born: Rodolfo Gonzales; June 18, 1928 Denver, Colorado, U.S.
- Died: April 12, 2005 (aged 76) Denver, Colorado, U.S.
- Height: 5 ft 8 in (174 cm)
- Weight: Lightweight; Super Featherweight; Featherweight
- Relative: Serena Gonzales-Gutierrez (granddaughter)

Boxing career
- Reach: 71 in (182 cm)
- Stance: Orthodox

Boxing record
- Total fights: 75
- Wins: 65
- Win by KO: 11
- Losses: 9
- Draws: 1

Rodolfo "Corky" Gonzales (June 18, 1928 – April 12, 2005) was a Mexican-American boxer, poet, political organizer, and activist. He was one of many leaders for the Crusade for Justice in Denver, Colorado. The Crusade for Justice was an urban rights and Chicano cultural urban movement during the 1960s focusing on social, political, and economic justice for Chicanos. Gonzales convened the first-ever Chicano Youth Liberation Conference in 1968, which was poorly attended due to timing and weather conditions. He tried again in March 1969, and established what is commonly known as the First Chicano Youth Liberation Conference. This conference was attended by many future Chicano activists and artists. It also birthed the Plan Espiritual de Aztlán, a pro-indigenist manifesto advocating revolutionary Chicano nationalism and self-determination for all Chicanos. Through the Crusade for Justice, Gonzales organized the Mexican American people of Denver to fight for their cultural, political, and economic rights, leaving his mark on history. He was honored with a Google Doodle in continued celebration of National Hispanic Heritage Month in the United States on October 1, 2021.

== Early life ==
Rodolfo Gonzales was born the youngest of Federico and Indalesia Gonzales's eight children in Denver, Colorado in 1928. His father had immigrated to Colorado at an early age from Chihuahua, Mexico. Even as an immigrant, Federico Gonzales taught the histories of Mexico's struggle against Spanish domination and against Porfirio Díaz. Federico Gonzales imparted his knowledge to his son, a struggle that culminated in the Mexican Revolution (1910–1920). Rodolfo’s mother, Indalesia Gonzales, died when Rodolfo was two years old; his father never remarried. His siblings were raised in Denver's tough "Eastside Barrio", where the Great Depression took an even heavier toll on Mexican Americans. However, according to Gonzales, "though the Depression was devastating to so many, we, as children, were so poor that it was hardly noticed". The Gonzaleses were a very poor family. Gonzales, along with his mother and siblings worked in the fields, and his father worked hard in the coal mines to provide for the family throughout Gonzales's life. Gonzales attended high schools in Colorado and New Mexico while simultaneously working in the beet fields, and graduated from Manual High School at the age of 16. Since his youth he demonstrated a fiery tendency, which caused his uncle to say that "He was always popping off like a cork. So, we called him Corky." The nickname stuck.

In February 1949, at the age of 21, Gonzales married Geraldine Romero, aged 17/18. They had eight children, who eventually took on their father's legacy of the Crusade for Justice.

== Boxing career ==
Gonzales had a successful professional boxing career and at one time was ranked as a top three Featherweight by Ring Magazine. However, he always lost when competing at the highest level and never received a shot at the title. He retired from the ring in 1955 after compiling a record of 63 wins, 11 losses, and 1 draw. Gonzales found the sport empowering, saying, "I bleed as the vicious gloves of hunger cut my face and eyes, as I fight my way from stinking barrios to the glamour of the ring and the lights of fame or mutilated sorrow." His success in boxing lent him a prominence that he would later capitalize upon during his political career. He was inducted into the Colorado Sports Hall of Fame in 1988. When Gonzales turned to politics, he was ranked the 5th best boxer in the world.

He once fought Willie Pep, losing by decision.

== Political activism ==
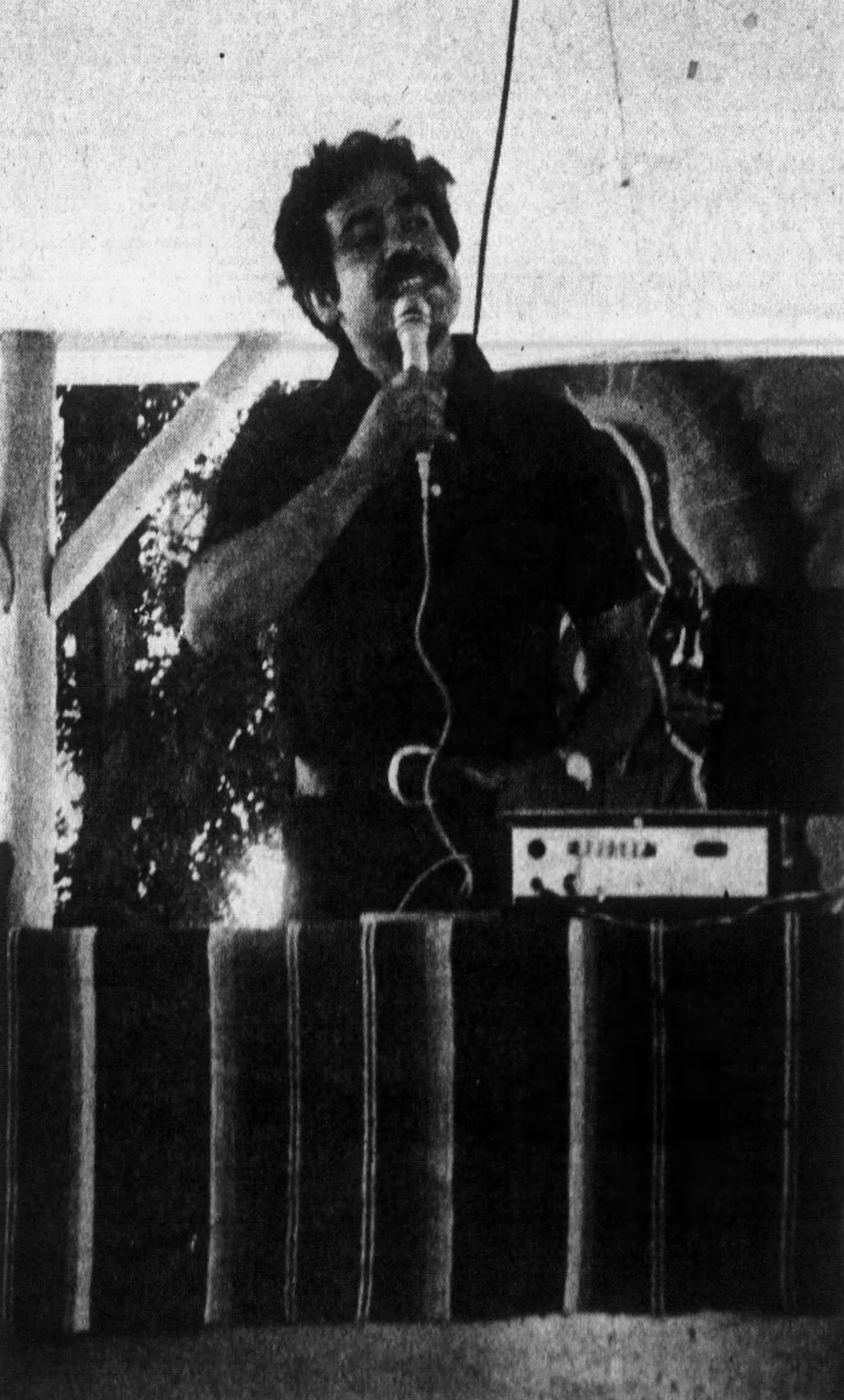
Gonzales addresses 400 spectators at the Las Vegas Plaza Park, June 17, 1973

Gonzales's early political involvement in the Democratic Party centered around campaigning for Denver Mayor J. Quigg Newton in 1947, registering Latino voters for the Democratic Party in 1950 and leading the Colorado "Viva Kennedy" campaign in 1960.

Gonzales's successful efforts to organize for change within the Democratic Party became a crucial turning point toward Chicano Nationalist politics and the foundation of the Crusade for Justice in 1967. In 1966, Gonzales had written a letter of resignation to Alfredo J. Hernandez, the chair of SER in Denver, stating, “S.E.R., is offering a gateway to a society that offers hypocrisy, sterilization, castration, and neurosis in exchange for the values of integrity that are inherent in our culture...I will not compromise my principles, me ideals and my honor to be seated at the same table with hypocrites.” Gonzales concluded that the two-party system offered little benefit. Believing Chicanos could not rely on the "gringo establishment" to provide education, economic stability, or social acceptance, he sought alternatives.

The Crusade for Justice was an idea born from the Fisherman's meetings. These meetings were the original organization of Chicanos discussing issues surrounding Chicano rights and culture. The Fisherman meetings started out small, without the structure the Crusade for Justice developed later. The goal was to gain a following, and to spread education on the injustices Chicanos were experiencing. To begin with, the Fisherman's meetings were only open to men. When the conversation started to cross over from culture to more political issues, such as border laws, women demanded a part in the discussions, as they were directly affected just as much as the men, by the topics at hand.

Gonzales believed strongly in the power of educating the people around him, and bringing the Chicano community together to hear one another's voices. He said, “You have to get people involved, and the best way to do that is to live among the people, to hear what they are saying and to agitate them”.

The development of the Crusade for Justice helped gain momentum for the Chicano Movement in Denver. The movement was not strictly political in their organizing and education; "it was about art, music, vision, pride, culture, and value of participation." Gonzales explained. Gonzales took the ideas developed through the Crusade and implemented them at a personal level, making it into the political force it became. He had the courage, confidence, and ability to inspire greatness within the entire Chicano community.

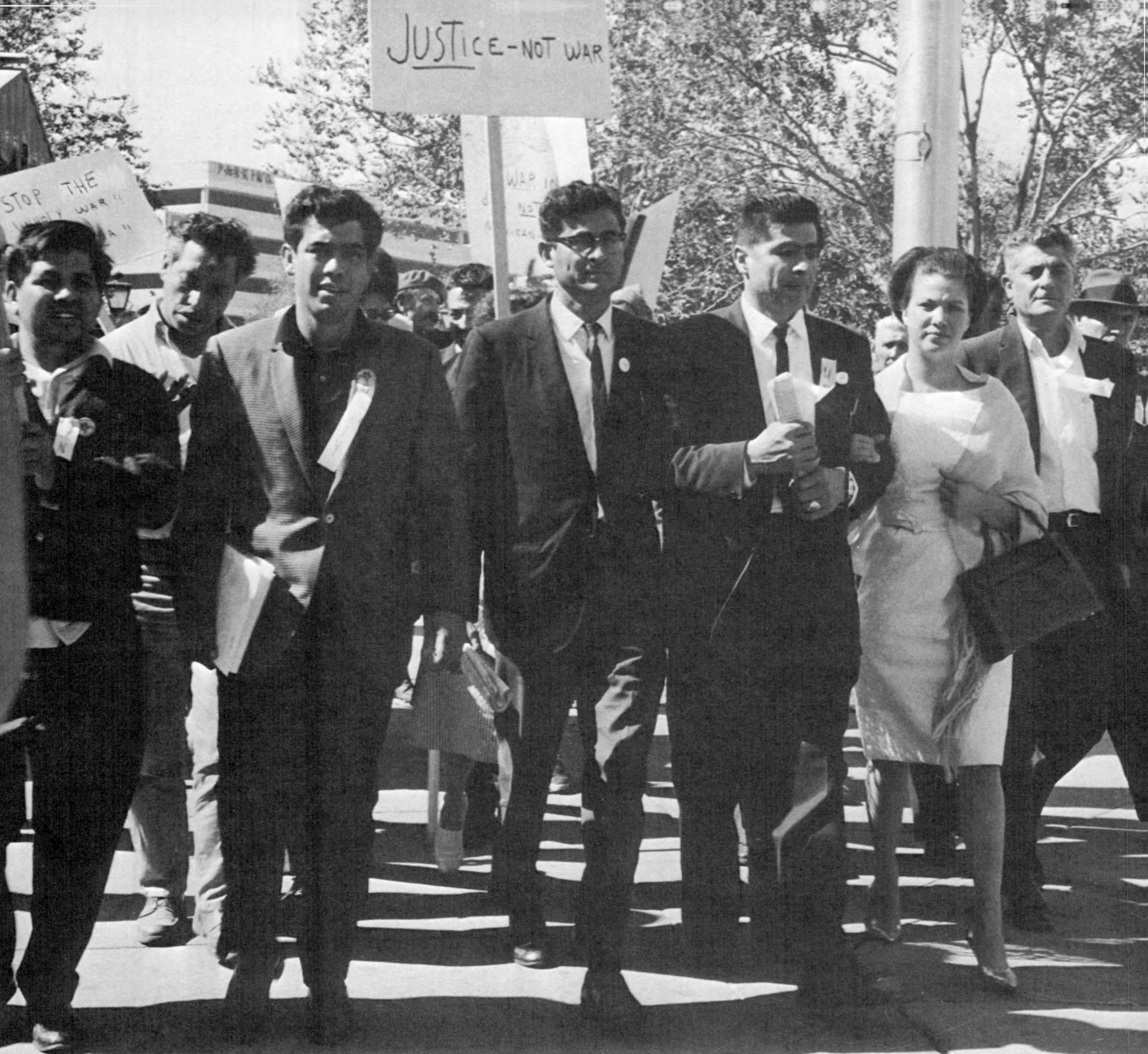
"Two of the most forceful personalities in the militant Mexican American movement lead a march to a La Raza Unida conference in El Paso. Beside a banner carrier is Rodolfo "Corky" Gonzalez, chairman, Crusade for Justice, Denver, Colo., and third from right, Reies Tijerina, president, Federal Alliance of Free City-States, Albuquerque, N.M. with his brother, Ramon, at his right arm, his wife, and another brother, Anselmo, on his left." Civil Rights Digest, Spring 1968

Gonzales became co-founder of a new political party, focused intensively on the rights of Mexican-American people. The party was called Congreso de Aztlán, referring to the land of the Southwest United States. Gonzales believed the only way to meet the goals created by the Crusade within the political world, was through the creation of a third political party. The main goal of the creation of this party was to unite the Mexican-American vote under one banner. The idea for this party was born at a pioneer youth conference in 1967, the conference was called by Reies Lopez Tijerina. The party gained immense support in Texas by 1970, and began spreading the party's reach shortly thereafter. Once it began to spread, there were issues due to a lack of coordination among different groups supporting the party. There were not enough resources to keep the party going, and it died out within the decade. Tijerina became one of Gonzales’ largest rivals throughout the parties expansion. Tijerina believed that the Congreso de Aztlán was doing more to separate the Mexican American vote than to unite it, and that working within the Democratic Party would provide larger success in the political world in reaching their goals.

Gonzales’ found a private school in 1971 as a solution to the issues within the public education system. The school would focus on building students' self-esteem through culturally-relevant curricula. It was named after Tlatelolco, a square in Mexico City. During the conquest, it was the site of the last stand of the Aztecs, witnessing the massacre of thousands. In post-Revolutionary Mexico, Tlatelolco became home to the Plaza de las Tres Culturas, which celebrated Mexico's dual cultural heritage, seen as vindication of indigenous Mexico. It was also home to a community of scholars. In 1968, Tlatelolco became the staging ground for massive student protests, and saw yet another massacre, this time by Mexican forces. As such, the school's name evokes the history of duality, reconciliation, and hope for indigenous and Mestizo people. The Tlatelolco massacres were in response to the Olympics, where thousands of people were being displaced for an Olympic event.

=== Yo Soy Joaquín - Poem ===
With his poem Yo soy Joaquín, known in English as I Am Joaquin, Gonzales shared his new cosmological vision of the "Chicano", who was neither Indian nor European, neither Mexican nor American, but a combination of all the conflicting identities. This new "raza", or "race" found its roots in the Pre-Columbian civilizations, which he believed gave it rights to inhabit the ancestral land of Aztlán. It was strengthened by conceptions such as those of José Vasconcelos, Mexico's Secretary of Education under the Revolutionary Álvaro Obregón, who proclaimed that the hope of humanity lay in the mixed "Raza Cósmica" of Latin America. But perhaps more than anywhere else, Joaquín, the archetypical Chicano, found hope for his future in his own personal and spiritual awakening, a realization forced upon him by his status as an oppressed minority in the United States.

Some scholars have credited Gonzales with authoring this historicized, politicized definition of what it is to be a "Chicano". The far-reaching effect of the poem is summed up by UC Riverside professor Juan Felipe Herrera: "Here, finally, was our collective song, and it arrived like thunder crashing down from the heavens. Every little barrio newspaper from Albuquerque to Berkeley published it. People slapped mimeographed copies up on walls and telephone poles." It was so influential that it was turned into a play by Luis Valdez's Teatro Campesino that toured nationally. It is seen as a foundational work of the burgeoning Chicano Art Movement that accompanied, complimented, and enhanced the Chicano Movement, and, as the Plan Espiritual de Aztlán exhorted those talented members of the community to use their abilities to advance la Causa ("the Cause"), Yo soy Joaquín provided a strong example.

A feminist analysis of Gonzales's poem reveals that women are submissive, and extensions of the men to which they are related in communal and familial ways. Chicanas are depicted as faithful, long-suffering religious figures or family matriarchs who exist to support Chicano males. Women are only discussed in relation to the suffering of Chicano males, and to serve as a support as for the epic heroes referenced in the body of the poem.

=== Electoral politics ===
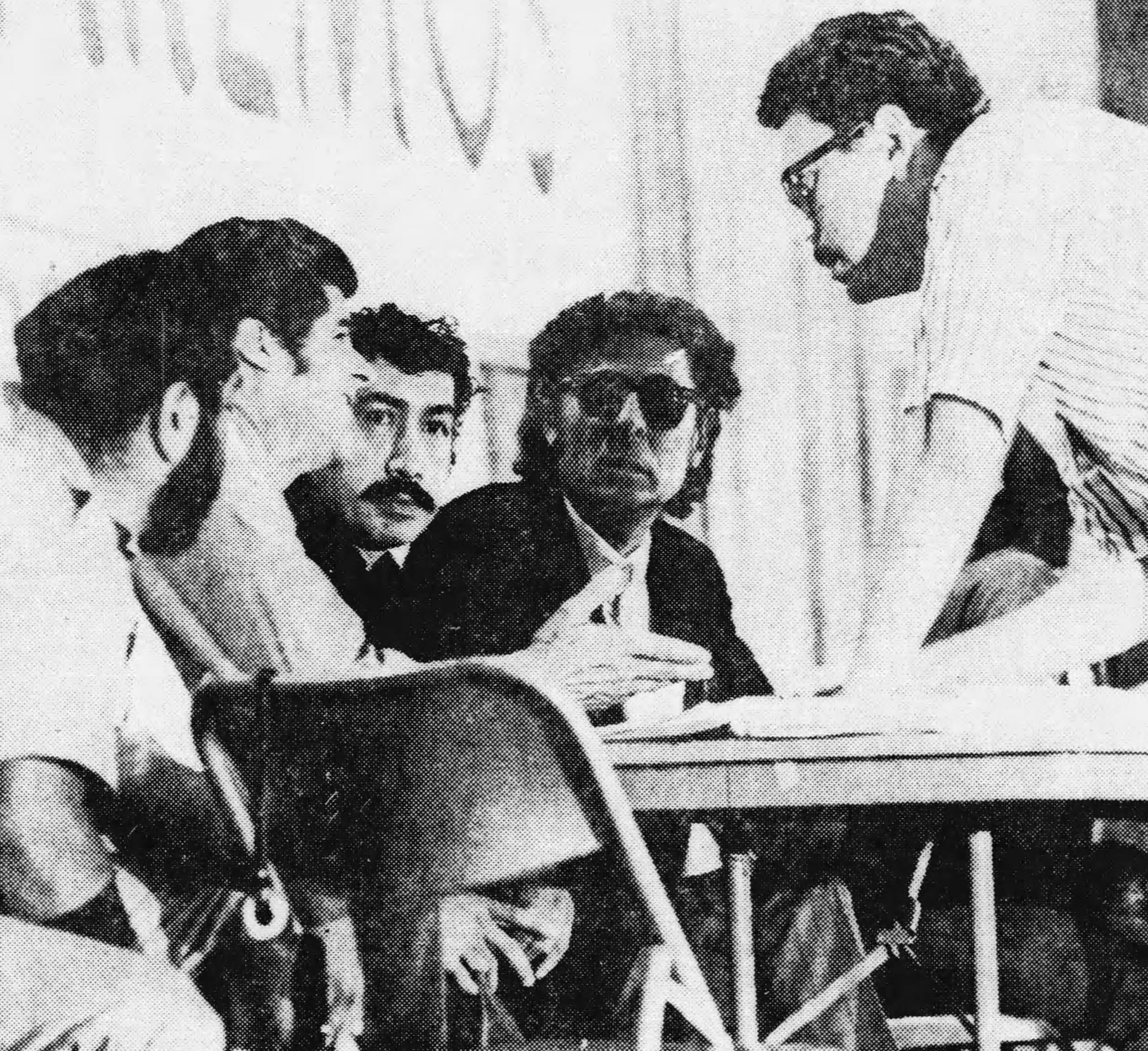
Three of the "Big Four" of the Chicano movement at the Raza Unida Party's 1972 convention: Reies Lopez Tijerina, New Mexico (second from left), Rodolfo "Corky" Gonzales, Colorado (center), and José Ángel Gutiérrez, Texas (far right). Cesar Chavez, California, did not attend.

Gonzales made several unsuccessful runs for public office. His first and closest to victory was in 1955, when he ran for Denver City Council against incumbent Elvin R. Caldwell Sr., coming in second place with 20% of the vote. Gonzales then ran for a seat in the Colorado House of Representatives in 1962; although he narrowly secured a spot on the Democratic Party's slate of 17 nominees in Denver County, he came in last place in the general election. He later ran for mayor of Denver in 1967, coming in fourth place with 3% of the vote. He was also the Peace and Freedom Party candidate for vice president in the 1972 election, but only in the state of Utah.

His granddaughter is Serena Gonzales-Gutierrez, a member of the Colorado House of Representatives.

== The Crusade for Justice ==
Gonzales and other Chicano activists had developed the image of the Crusade for Justice as ‘the vanguard’ of the rapidly growing Chicano Power Movement. “The Crusade, originally a multi-issue, broad-based civil rights organization oriented toward nonviolence, came to symbolize Chicano self-determination and espoused a strong nationalist ideology that militant youth found extremely attractive. [….]”

The Crusade for Justice was born out of the growing awareness of the inequality Mexican-Americans were experiencing in their daily lives within the United States. It became obvious through high school graduation statistics that "school systems have failed the Mexican-American people." More than any other demographic, Chicano students were ending up in labor jobs and prisons, dropping out, and not being given the same opportunities by their faculty/advisors as were white students.

Due to the growing awareness within the Chicano community of the injustices they experienced within all layers of society, many gatherings, organizations and outreach programs participated in the development of the Crusade. The Viva Kennedy Committee was created by John F. Kennedy's presidential campaign in the early 1960s, with goals to increase voter turnout in the Hispanic community for the election in 1960 against Nixon.

This helped to politically activate many Chicanos, but the goal of the Viva Kennedy Campaign was to strengthen John F. Kennedy’s electoral support. The goal was not directly focused on Chicano power, pride, or justice. Gonzales recognized that if the goals of the Chicano movement were to be met, activism within the Chicano community needed to be led by those who were impacted by the injustices experienced, and so action towards creating a movement from within the Chicano community started to take form. The Viva Kennedy Campaign helped to spark the beginning of the Crusade, but that was exactly what it was, the beginning.

Before Chicanos started protesting as a collective group, most of the United States was unaware of the unjust treatment of Mexican-American people. At the time this movement started the American Southwest had a population of over 5 million Mexican-Americans. People started taking action, hiking hundreds of miles to state capitals to bring awareness to their cause. In the spring of 1966 there was a march from Delano, California, to Sacramento, a distance of 300 miles. That same summer farm workers hiked again in Texas to protest low wages from San Juan to Austin. Mexican-American leaders attended federally sponsored conferences and meetings, and walked out because their needs were not being accurately met or represented.

This movement was given influence from the civil rights movement at the time, led by Martin Luther King Jr. Dr. Ralph Guzman, a professor in political science and an important figure in the Chicano movement stated in his Viva la Causa article that “Mexican-Americans have drawn from the dramatic struggle of the Negro people. But they have added artistry of their own”. The Chicano movement was not strictly centered around political activism, it was about art, music, vision, pride, culture, and value of participation. Gonzales made sure to lead with strength of character and humility, and encouraged his fellow activists to do the same. Anti-violence was a tactic the Crusade for Justice aimed for, but it was not a goal as it was in the following of MLK.

Gonzales knew that the Crusade was being watched closely by the FBI and even the mafia, Chicanos were often mislabeled, and their motives and tactics were demonized by the media. There were no chances to be taken. The Crusade’s goal was to bring justice, to introduce change through struggle, operating within the preset guidelines of the United States judicial system, not to start a war. Gonzales’s character is illustrated in the letter he wrote to S.E.R. (Service-Employment-Redevelopment), an organization that focuses on the needs of Hispanics, specifically in the areas of education, training, employment, business, and economic opportunity. Gonzales wrote to the Chairman of the Board of S.E.R., Mr. Alfredo J. Hernández: “S.E.R., is offering a gateway to a society that offers hypocrisy, sterilization, castration, and neurosis in exchange for the values of integrity that are inherent in our culture—I will not compromise my principles, my ideals and my honor to be seated at the same table with hypocrites.”

Dr. Ralph Guzman wrote: “This is a new era, and Mexican-Americans are activated Americans. They are telling American that they, too, are entering the game; that they, too, belong. How well they succeed will be directly related to their own abilities to replace fragmented, weak organizations by effective political unity, to utilize ethnic identity as a root-force for progress within a larger society and to develop leadership dedicated to the fulfillment of the rising expectations of all Mexican-Americans”. And Gonzales did.

== Chicano Youth Liberation Conferences ==
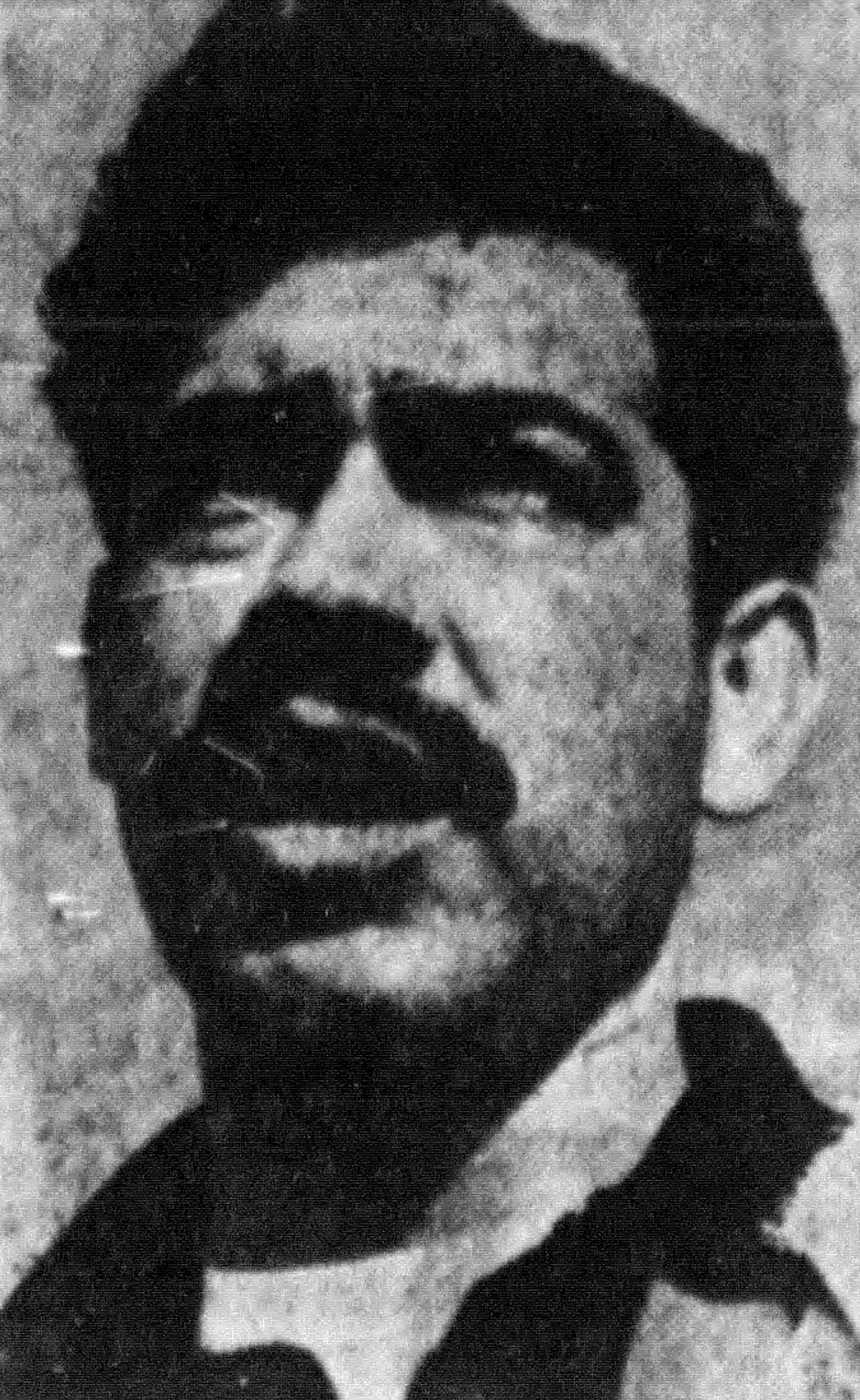
Gonzales c. 1968

In 1968, the Poor People's Campaign in Washington, D.C., was originally started by Martin Luther King Jr. After his assassination, associates took on the campaign that represented the first broad-based initiatives introduced by Mexican Americans, African Americans, and Native Americans to promote economic justice and land rights. Participants attended seminars and panels on organizing, activism, and self-defense as well as Chicano culture and gender issues. The activities within these seminars, workshops, and panels were painting, poetry, debates, and networking to other activists in the country. A main idea that developed from this campaign was that everyone would be united in the struggle against oppression, exploitation, and racism. Like third-world countries who have fought against colonialism and the dominance of European and American imperialism, Chicanos began to see their struggles the same way: Chicanos too had been colonized by mainstream American Society, stripped of culture, and taught to be ashamed of who they were and where they came from.

The best known Chicano Youth Liberation Conference was held in 1969, brought together large numbers of Chicano youth from throughout the United States, and provided them with opportunities to express views on self-determination and involved in both on-campus and community politics. This conference brought youth of all types - students, non-students, militant youth from the street gangs (vatos locos), and ex-convicts (pintos) to discuss community issues and politics of 3,000 people. The conference emphasized themes related to the quest for identity as popularized by Gonzáles and Luis Valdez, which were “eagerly received by students searching for an ideology for the emerging student movement.” Chicano youth believed that for Mexican Americans to be instilled with pride in their ethnicity and culture; Chicanos needed to reject the dominant values of American Society, including capitalism and white Anglo-Saxon Protestant culture.

During the week-long conference, Gonzáles stressed the need for students and youth to play a revolutionary role in the movement. Conference participants were told that previous generations of students, after completing academic programs and becoming professionals, had abdicated their responsibility to their people, to their familia de La Raza. This abdication of responsibility was attributed to the fact that Mexican American students had been Americanized by the schools, that the youth had been conditioned to accept the dominant values of American society, particularly individualism, at the expense of their Mexican identity. The result had been the psychological ‘colonization’ of Mexican American youth.”

The first conference in March 1969 produced a document, “Plan Espiritual de Aztlán,” which developed the concept of ethnic nationalism and self-determination in the struggle for Chicano liberation. The statement of the “revolutionary caucus” also came out of that conference. “For 144 years we have been trying to peacefully coexist but no peace has come to our communities. Revolution is the only means available to us. We owe no allegiance, no respect, to any of the laws of this racist country. Our liberation struggle is a war of survival.”

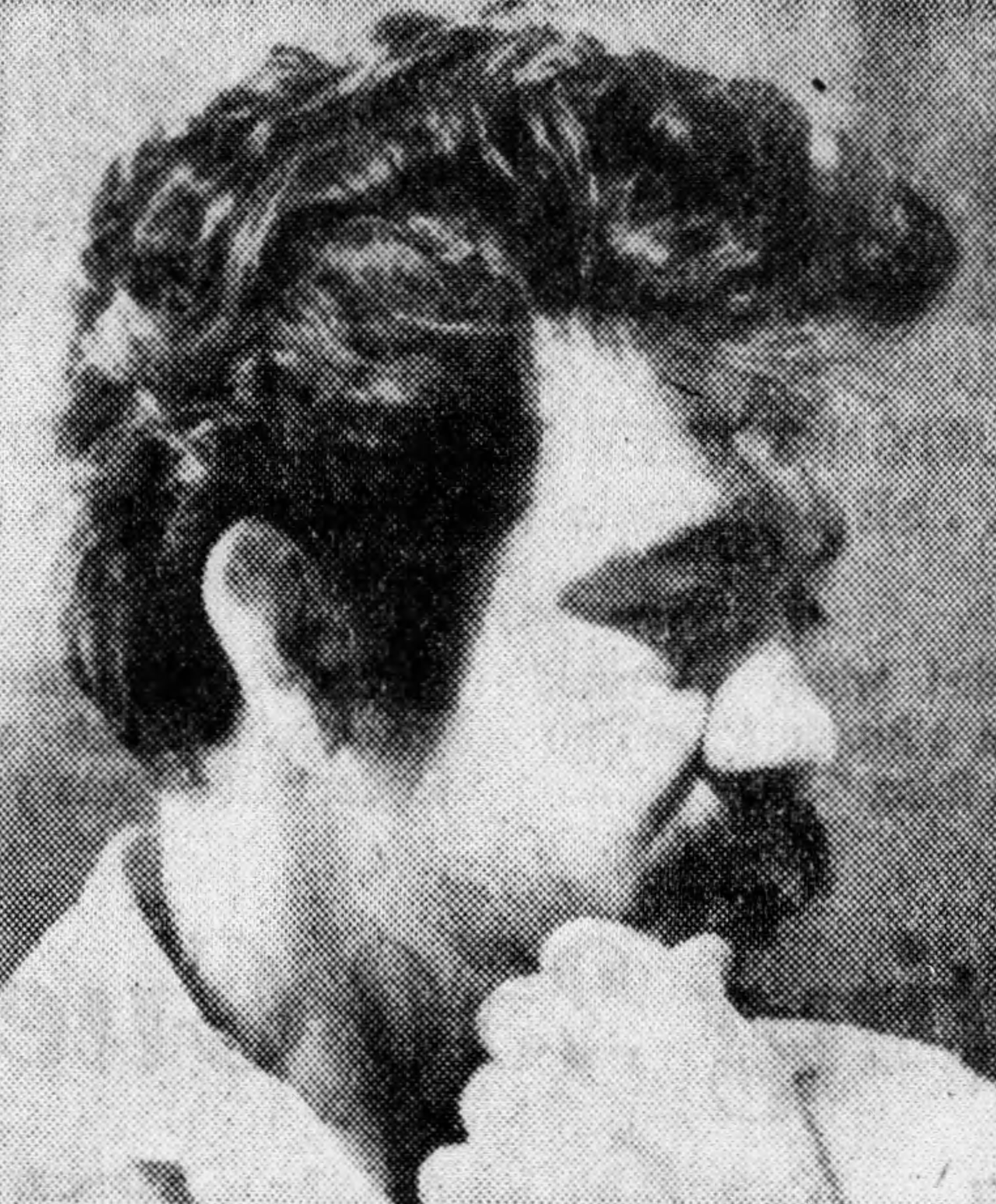
Gonzales c. 1969

The second Chicano Youth Liberation Conference (CYLC) in 1970 (March 25) represented a further refinement in Gonzáles’s efforts toward Chicano self-determination, the formation of the Colorado Raza Unida Party. The demonstration of “Chicano Youth Unity” became the “spirit of Denver.” Juan Lopez and Sam Kushner wrote about the Second Youth Conference calling it “a call for the creation of a Nation of Aztlán and the formation of an independent Chicano party, guided by the congress of Aztlán.”The conference was sponsored by the Crusade for Justice, expanding their reach to encourage and mobilize the youth within the community. The second CYLC had 14 states represented that included civil and human rights organizations bringing anyone in the Chicano movement together. “Enemies and friends gathered and got along all under one roof.” Political figures, community members, militant groups, and gangs were all represented uniting under La Raza. La Raza meant, “we are one nation. If one is oppressed, we’re all oppressed. If one is hungry, we’re all hungry. We are one nation. La Nation de Aztlán.” The Currigan Exhibition Hall was offered as a place for the conference to be held, placed adjacently to the Denver PD. Gonzales refused the offer, stating “they wanted to seal us in and keep an eye on us”. Instead the conference was held at the Stockyard Stadium on 46th Avenue and Interstate 70. The conference events included political, educational, Aid Farmworkers workshops, and cultural performances where big figures in the movement like Gonzales, Manuel Lopez, and the Latin Defense Organization spoke. Other workshops included women’s workshops that focused on family and equality for women. “If we had liberated mothers, we would be free too. My question is now, when?” 3,000 to 5,000 youth were expected to attend the conference. People travelled from all over the country to attend the conference. The Model Cities, a coalition geared towards improving the lives of youth in different areas donated 1,000 dollars in a food fund to the Chicano Youth Conference. Conference facilitators also provided food and housing for the visiting youth.

=== “El Plan Espiritual de Aztlán” ===
“El Plan Espiritual de Aztlán” is an indigenous irredentist claim to Aztlán. This involves creating power in the Chicano community through community lead and serving organizations. It demonstrates that Chicanos are the only ones that truly have rights to the land. “El Plan Espiritual de Aztlán, which sought to organize the Chicano people around a nationalist program. Also what came out of this conference was this statement by the Revolutionary Caucus, which sought a politics beyond narrow nationalism, toward more class analysis and internationalism”. This was a beginning point of a more internationalist outlook for certain sections of the Chicano Movement.

The plan called for the mass mobilization of Chicanos under the same identity, the Mestizo Nation. The new identity of Chicanos described them as a free community with their own culture. The Mestizo Nation also stated that Chicano community was free economically and that were together under the political beliefs. This idea was basically the starting point for the creation of a third political party in favor of the Chicano community. In 1969 the “El Plan Espiritual de Aztlán” was implemented and developed designed to bring political, economic, social power of Chicano people. One idea from the plan was to create community controlled institutions like schools, law enforcement, production of resources, development of cultural values, etc. that resemble the Chicano people.

== Bibliography ==
- I am Joaquin : an epic poem, (1967).
- Message to Aztlán: selected writings of Rodolfo "Corky" Gonzales, (2001) Houston: Arte Público Press. ISBN 1-55885-331-6.

== See also ==
- Oscar Zeta Acosta
- César Chávez
- Chicanismo
- Chicano poetry
- Civil Rights Movement
- Carlota D. EspinoZa
- Hector P. Garcia
- Dolores Huerta
- List of notable Chicanos
- MEChA
- Mexican Americans
- Reies Tijerina
- Malcolm X
- Young Lords

== Notes ==
- Marín, Christine. A spokesman of the Mexican American movement : Rodolfo "Corky" Gonzales and the fight for Chicano liberation, 1966-1972, San Francisco: R. and E. Research Associates, 1977. ISBN 0-88247-423-5
- Haro, Juan. The Ultimate Betrayal - An Autobiography. (ISBN 080594379X / 0-8059-4379-X)
