= Plan de Santa Bárbara =

U.S. educational manifesto

El Plan de Santa Bárbara: A Chicano Plan for Higher Education is a 155-page document, which was written in 1969 by the Chicano Coordinating Council on Higher Education. Drafted at the University of California Santa Barbara, it is a blueprint for the inception of Chicana/o studies programs in colleges and universities throughout the US. The Chicano Coordinating Council expresses political mobilization to be dependent upon political consciousness, thus the institution of education is targeted as the platform to raise political conscious amongst Chicanos and spur higher learning to political action. The Plan proposes a curriculum in Chicano studies, the role of community control in Chicano education and the necessity of Chicano political independence. The document was a framework for educational and curriculum goals for the Chicano movements within the institution of education, while being the foundation for the Chicano student group Movimiento Estudiantil Chicano de Aztlán (MEChA).

The plan itself begins with a manifesto which calls for a renaissance and a "quest for cultural expression and freedom" and continues by pushing back against racist power structures and assimilation and a push toward the importance of community and pride in Chicanismo. The manifesto asks the colleges and universities within state of California to act in the following areas:

1. Admission and recruitment of Chicano students, faculty, administrators, and staff;
2. A curriculum program and an academic major relevant to the Chicano cultural and historical experience;
3. Support and tutorial programs;
4. Research programs;
5. Publications programs; and
6. Community, cultural, and social action programs.

Finally, it calls for students, faculty, employees and the community to come together as "central and decisive designers and administrators of these programs".

Following the manifesto, the document lays out a plan for organizing Chicano programs; recruitment and admissions, support programs, curriculum, political action, the outline of the degrees offered including a Bachelor of Arts and an associate degree, and proposed courses including those for Chicano history, contemporary politics of the Southwest, and Mexican American sociology. The document closes with an outline of a Barrio Center program which aims to reach out to students outside of the colleges and universities in regards to dissemination of college entrance information, community engagement and the presence of on-going research proposed by Chicano scholars. Throughout the plan are pictures of those in the Chicano movement as well as art drawn by members of MEChA. This manifesto was adopted in April 1969.

== Critical response ==
Indigenous history and traditional myths were used in the Chicano movement to create a nationalist political identity based on reclaiming cultures and histories. They were also purposed to imagine Aztlán, the mythical homeland for Chicana/o people, as both a physical place and a nexus for change in educational and academic communities. The concept of Aztlán is given a home in higher education, as those who created this plan were “students, faculty, administrators, and community delegates representing…La Alta California, Aztlán.” This text includes myriad references to “La Raza de Aztlán” and indigenous ways of knowing across subjects. Proposed curricula include indigenous histories of science, sociology, architecture, and music, among many other subjects. Because of this, some argue that the Chicano movement was exemplified and institutionalized through projects like El Plan de Santa Bárbara. Imagining the future of education is described as a matter of social justice for Chicana/o authors, as it is a way for them to imagine a world outside of colonial constructs. Thus, professors, students, and administrators from UC Santa Barbara and Chicana/o Studies departments across the country reference El Plan de Santa Bárbara as a key player in the institutionalization of Chicano ideology and its recognition across the Southwest and within the academic community. Given the context of Chicana/o exclusion in academia, this plan is described as an explicit call for equity.

== Critiques ==
Despite the emphasis on equality in higher education curricula, the androcentrism and heteronormativity of the Chicano movement is recognized and critiqued as a site for future improvement in which a diverse Chicana/o population can be included. Academics of Chicana/o Studies argue that the exclusion of women and the LGBT community in Chicano manifestos such as El Plan de Santa Bárbara and El Plan Espiritual de Aztlán embody the limitations of the future this movement was working towards, as it was exclusionary. Chicana feminism is explained as a response to the limitations of texts like El Plan de Santa Bárbara, such that Chicana feminists had to work to reassert overlooked identities in contemporary and future discussions of Chicana/o movements for social change. UC Santa Barbara’s Office of Public Affairs and Communications maintains that the work of the movement is still in progress, and professors argue that, while El Plan has solidified the presence of Chicana/o Studies in higher education, further implementation of the original plan’s true intentions of community-building will lead to more inclusive representation of Chicana/o students.

== See also ==
- Chicano Movement
- Movimiento Estudiantil Chicano de Aztlán (MEChA)
- Aztlán
- Plan Espiritual de Aztlán
