= The Land of the Silver Apples =

2007 children's fantasy novel by Nancy Farmer

- Front cover of first edition
- Author: Nancy Farmer
- Cover artist: Gene Mollica
- Language: English
- Series: Sea of Trolls (#2)
- Genre: Children's fantasy novel
- Publisher: Atheneum Books
- Publication date: August 21, 2007
- Publication place: United States
- Media type: Print (hardcover)
- Pages: 496 pp
- ISBN: 1-416-90735-1
- Preceded by: The Sea of Trolls
- Followed by: The Islands of the Blessed

The Land of the Silver Apples is a fantasy novel for children, written by Nancy Farmer and published by Atheneum in 2007. It is a sequel to The Sea of Trolls, second in a series of three (as of 2013) known as the Sea of Trolls series or the Saxon Saga. The title refers to the "silver apples of the moon" associated with the land of faerie in W. B. Yeats' poem "The Song of Wandering Aengus". The book received the Emperor Norton Award (2007).

== Plot summary ==
Jack and his companions take Lucy to a shrine where the demons she is believed to harbor may be cast out, but things go badly wrong. Lucy is abducted by the Lady of the Lake and Jack must follow her underground to the lands of the hobgoblins and elves. He meets Thorgil again and, with her and a new friend, Pega, must face tests beyond anything they can imagine. They must learn to see through the enchantments of the elves (who are the fallen angels) and to face still darker powers in the underworld.

== See also ==
Critical Reception

Deborah L. Thompson and Susan Lehr hailed the book as a "spectacular" sequel to The Sea of Trolls and prophesied that it would "find a dedicated audience despite its length. Marek Oziewicz found that the Saxon saga "represents one of the most notable recent examples of fantastic dialogue between the past and the present. . . While seeing the 8th century world through Jack's eyes, [young readers] can become aware of what choices should be made in the story, relate this knowledge to their own lives, and explore their own systems of beliefs to their outer edges."
