= The Ear, the Eye and the Arm =

1994 children's novel by Nancy Farmer

The Ear, the Eye, and the Arm
- First edition
- Author: Nancy Farmer
- Language: English
- Genre: Children's, science fiction novel, Dystopian Fiction
- Publisher: Orchard Books
- Publication date: April 1994
- Publication place: United States
- Media type: Print (hardback & paperback)
- Pages: 311 (first edition, hardback)
- ISBN: 0-531-06829-3 (first edition, hardback)
- OCLC: 28887914
- LC Class: PZ7.F23814 Ear 1994

The Ear, the Eye, and the Arm is a children's science fiction novel by American writer Nancy Farmer. It was awarded a Newbery Honor. The novel is set in Zimbabwe in the year 2194, with a strong theme of Afrofuturism.

Combining elements of science fiction and African culture, the book depicts the struggle of a notorious general's three children to escape from their kidnappers in the technologically advanced and crime-infested capital of Zimbabwe.

== Plot ==
In Zimbabwe in the year 2194, Chief of Security General Matsika leads a battle against the gangs which terrorize the nation. His three children, Tendai, Rita, and Kuda, are kept in a fortified mansion to ensure their security. Seeking adventure to earn the Scout Badge, they escape the house with the help of the Mellower, a praise singer employed by their parents. The children then find themselves in the busy streets of Mbare Musika, where they are kidnapped and taken to Dead Man's Vlei, the lair of the She Elephant, a child trafficker. There, they are forced to work in the plastic mines. Their parents enlist the help of the Ear, the Eye, and the Arm, three mutant detectives. Ear has super-sensitive hearing; Eye has hawk-like vision; Arm has empathic powers which allow him to sense others' feelings and see into their souls.

Tendai realizes that the She Elephant is planning to sell them to the Masks, a gang who have evaded General Matsika's efforts to combat crime. The siblings escape to Resthaven, an independent country within Zimbabwe which aims to retain traditional African culture. Eventually, the children are banished from Resthaven.

The children seek help from the Mellower's mother, Mrs. Horsepool-Worthingham, who takes them into her care. Tendai discovers that the Mellower's mother is holding them for ransom. The She Elephant again captures the children and takes them to one of the Masks' secret lairs. The Masks take the children to the Mile-High MacIlwaine, a skyscraper which houses the Gondwannan Embassy, the real headquarters of the Masks.

While the Masks attempt to sacrifice Tendai to their gods, Arm is possessed by a mhondoro, a holy and legendary spirit of the land, who helps him to find the children. When Arm is knocked out, the mhondoro helps Tendai and his friends to incapacitate the Big-Head Mask, a manifestation of a Gondwannan god. When the children's parents arrive, the She Elephant crushes the Mask, and the mhondoro revives Arm. The gang is destroyed and their stolen wealth is redistributed among the poor. The children reunite with their parents, and General Matsika allows his children to have freedom.

== Reception ==
Kirkus Reviews found that "Farmer has created a splendidly imaginative fantasy", while Publishers Weekly wrote "Farmer uses her knowledge of Africa to imagine a city in 23rd-century Zimbabwe, combining old traditions and speculative technology with delightfully entertaining results", and concluded "Farmer is emerging as one of the best and brightest authors for the YA audience".
