= The House of the Scorpion =

American young adult science fiction novel

- Front cover of first edition, later printing with medal images
- Author: Nancy Farmer
- Cover artist: Russell Gordon
- Language: English
- Genre: Young adult, science fiction novel, dystopian novel
- Publisher: Atheneum Books
- Publication date: 2002
- Publication place: United States
- Media type: Print (hardback & paperback)
- Pages: 380 (first edition, hard)
- ISBN: 0-689-85222-3 (first edition, hard)
- OCLC: 48796533
- Dewey Decimal: [Fic] 21
- LC Class: PZ7.F23814 Ho 2002
- Followed by: The Lord of Opium

The House of the Scorpion is a 2002 science fiction young adult novel by Nancy Farmer. It is set in the future and mostly takes place in Opium, a country which separates Aztlán (formerly Mexico) and the United States. The main character, Matteo Alacrán, or Matt, is a young clone of a drug lord of the same name, usually called "El Patrón" (Spanish for "The Boss"). Matt struggles to survive as a free individual and understand his personal identity. The book was followed by a sequel, The Lord of Opium, in 2013.

== Background ==
The idea was originally from a short story that Farmer wrote for an anthology, which she withdrew and then expanded after realizing it was too closely tied to her own life. The novel is partly inspired by Farmer's experience of rescuing a Mexican immigrant from dying in the desert, as is evidenced in the theme of illegal immigration.

On her personal website, Farmer says she wrote the novel for her son, who is dyslexic. Also on her website, Farmer notes that swear words were removed from the manuscript before publication, and that she wished the novel were 50 pages longer.

Farmer chose the scorpion symbol because El Patrón, a main character in the novel, is from the Mexican state of Durango, a state known for its scorpion population.

Farmer based many of the novel's characters on figures from her life, both in childhood and present day.

== Plot ==
This story is set in the country of Opium, a narrow strip of land between Mexico (now called Aztlán), and the United States. Opium is ruled by Matteo Alacrán, or El Patrón (Spanish for "The Boss"), an incredibly powerful drug lord, who is over 140 years old. Opium consists of several drug-producing Farms, the Alacrán estate (which produces opium poppies) being the largest and where some of the Alacrán family stay.

The protagonist, Matt, is a clone of El Patrón. For the first six years of his life, he lives in a small house on the edge of the poppy fields with Celia, a cook working in El Patrón's mansion. When he is discovered by three children, Emilia, Steven, and Maria, he smashes a window and jumps out of the house. Unaware of the danger of jumping barefoot onto smashed glass, he has to be carried to El Patrón's mansion to be treated for his injuries. Matt is treated kindly until Mr. Alacrán, El Patrón's great-grandson, recognizes him as a clone, which results in a few months of him being locked in a room and treated like an animal. When he finds out, El Patrón is furious and gives Matt clothes and his own room and commands everyone to treat him with respect. Matt is also given a bodyguard, Tam Lin, a reformed terrorist who becomes a father figure to Matt.

During the seven years that Matt lives in the house, he befriends María, which gradually blossoms into romance. When he first enters the house, he knows that he is a clone but does not really know what that means. Matt later discovers that all clones are supposed to be injected when "harvested" (born) with a compound that cripples their brains and turns them into little more than thrashing, drooling animals meant to donate organs. In denial, he convinces himself that El Patrón would not hire tutors for him and keep him entertained if he wanted to kill him, and that instead, he must be wanted to run the country when El Patrón dies.

At Steven and Emilia's wedding, El Patrón has a nearly-fatal heart attack. Matt and María attempt to flee in the ensuing chaos but are betrayed by the newlyweds. María is taken back to the convent in which she studies, and Matt is taken to the hospital, where El Patrón finally confirms that Matt was created only as an organ donor to keep him alive. At that moment, Celia reveals that she has been giving Matt doses of arsenic, which were not large enough to kill Matt but would be deadly to one as frail as El Patrón. The resulting rage of El Patrón causes him to have a fatal heart attack. Mr. Alacrán calls doctors to take him to emergency surgery, and after El Patrón dies, he orders Tam Lin to dispose of Matt. Tam Lin pretends to comply but gives Matt supplies and sets him on a path to Aztlán.

Arriving in Aztlán, Matt comes across a group of orphans, the "Lost Boys", who live in an orphanage operated by the "Keepers", a group of fervent Marxists who preach the "Five Principles of Good Citizenship" and the "Four Attitudes Leading to Right-Mindfulness". The Keepers operate plankton farms, force the orphans to do manual labor and to subsist on plankton, while they themselves enjoy luxurious quarters and food. At first, Matt is an outcast because the other boys think he is a spoiled aristocrat. However, he becomes a hero when he defies the Keepers and leads the boys in a rebellion.

He then is shut up in a closet for the night after the incident, until the next morning. Here, he is dumped in the "Boneyard", a dried lake full of whale bones, delicately balanced. After he manages to get free, he and Chacho are rescued by Ton-Ton and Fidelito, who drive the shrimp harvester to San Luis to find María and her mother, the politically powerful Esperanza Mendoza.

Esperanza thanks the boys for giving her the ability to take down the Keepers. Matt learns that Opium is in a country-wide lockdown but manages to re-enter the country, only to learn that the entire Alacrán family is dead, and the estate is empty except for servants, including Celia. Those at El Patrón's wake, including Tam Lin, who promised El Patrón, drank poisoned wine, which El Patrón saved to be served at his funeral since he never intended to die and wanted to run the business forever or to have it and everyone else die with him.

Matt takes on the role of El Patrón to become the new ruler of Opium, with intentions to dismantle the current regime.

== Main characters ==
Matteo (Matt) Alacrán: The protagonist, Matt is the most recent clone of El Patrón. Raised in close proximity to the Alacrán estate, Matt is constantly reminded of his position as a clone, being of equal status to cattle. As such, Matt grows up wanting to prove himself better than anyone else, so they will be forced to acknowledge him. The House of the Scorpion follows Matt's journey from a young boy growing up in a small house with his caretaker, Celia, to his subsequent realization of his autonomy and self-worth. Throughout much of the book, Matt struggles to find balance between his selfishness and desire to prove himself, with being kind and moral to others. At first, Matt views El Patrón as a very dear man whom he cares about deeply, yet slowly starts to realize the cruel nature of the man. Helped along the way with family and friends, Matt realizes the corrupt nature of Opium and eventually seeks to change the drug-powered land for the better.

Matteo (El Patrón) Alacrán: A powerful drug lord in the land of Opium. El Patrón extends his life by replacing his body parts with those of younger clones. By doing so, he has lived far longer than the average person at 140 years old. He likes to give his clones what he considers a luxurious life, because he lives vicariously through his clones experiencing a life of privilege he never had growing up. When Matt expresses musical talent, he immediately hires a music teacher so he can enjoy the talent he never got to foster. Though he is affectionate to Matt, he is cruel and domineering towards everyone else, including his own family. He is quick to turn people into eejits, the mindless slaves that work his fields and tend to other manual work. He is widely feared for his cruelty and power. Everything, from the land, wealth, power, and people, belongs to him and him alone. When he has a heart attack due to Matt's failure to provide a heart, he poisons his entire family to ensure his empire and all his possessions fall with him.

Celia: Matt's caretaker and mother figure, Celia is a kind, caring woman who protects Matt fiercely from any threat. When she finds out Matt's heart is due to replace El Patrón's, she begins to poison Matt with tiny amounts of arsenic- not enough to kill Matt, but certainly kill someone with a weaker immune system. Described as a hardworking woman, Celia always made sure to make time for Matt, carrying him to bed every night, even past the point of exhaustion where she almost collapsed after working all day. Matt grows up in her care learning love despite being treated negatively by others, describing her snores to be a comforting, familiar sound.

Tam Lin: Both Matt and El Patrón's body guard, he is described as having curly brown hair, blue eyes, and covered in scars. He has a tough, unfriendly exterior, though he proves on multiple occasions he cares for Matt, such as when he saves him from choking while he is young and later, helping Matt escape into the mountains to avoid a fate of dying as a clone. Tam Lin spends a lot of time at Celia's house with Matt, teaching him survival skills such as cooking and camping. Before working for El Patrón, Tam Lin was a Scottish nationalist, described by others as a terrorist for attempting to blow up a government official. Instead, he accidentally killed 20 children. Deciding to make amends for the wrongs he committed at the end, Tam Lin allows El Patrón to poison and kill him along with the rest of the Alacrán family.

== Themes ==
The House of the Scorpion is a story about the struggle to survive as a free individual and the search for a personal identity. The novel deals with issues and ethics around human cloning.

Technology: Matt wrestles with his status as a clone, as well as what being El Patrón's clone means for his future. Trained as a scientist, Nancy Farmer recognized the positives of modern technology, as well as human's ability to "pervert" it, particularly where it concerns cloning drug lords and making powerful bombs and other weapons. Discussing cloning, Nancy Farmer disclosed she has "consciously not really judged" cloning humans, so long as it's not for their body parts, and does not mind when animals are cloned. Further, though Matt is a direct clone of El Patrón, he is not a complete duplicate, and possesses qualities unique to an upbringing surrounded by love and certain circumstances. Though clones possess the same DNA and physical appearance, there are certain traits that only appear if they were nurtured. For example, Matt proves to be musically gifted, a talent encouraged by Celia. El Patrón possesses the same talent, yet it "withered and died" due to lack of training.

Coming of Age: As a clone, Matt's value is in the health of his organs, as to prolong the life of his benefactor, El Patrón. Clones share the same status as cattle, and Matt is "regarded as property whose value extends only as far as the usefulness of his body parts." In The House of the Scorpion, coming of age for Matt means "claiming humanity", and rising above his status as livestock. The book centers around Matt's journey to claim independence, self-worth, and sense of purpose in an environment surrounded by hate.

== Literary style ==
Though the novel details moral issues involved with human cloning, in his review for The New York Times, Roger Sutton argued that the novel is only nominally science fiction, and is more often a realistic fiction tale with elements of the adventure story.

== Reception ==
Reviewing the novel in The New York Times, Roger Sutton traced the novel's roots back to Pinocchio, as both novels feature non-human characters desperate to become human. Sutton called the novel "a big, ambitious tale."

Publishers Weekly, in a starred review of the novel, noted that "Farmer grippingly demonstrates that there are no easy answers. The questions she raises will haunt readers long after the final page."

Kirkus Reviews, also in a starred review, called The House of the Scorpion "a must-read for SF fans."

== Awards ==
It won the U.S. National Book Award for Young People's Literature and was named a Newbery Honor Book and a Michael L. Printz Honor Book. In the speculative fiction field, it was a runner-up for the Locus Award in the young adult category and the Mythopoeic Award in the children's category.

- National Book Award for Young People's Literature (United States), 2002—winner
- Northern California Book Award 2002
- Newbery Honor, 2003—runner-up for Newbery Medal
- Michael L. Printz Award Honor Book, 2003
- Buxtehuder Bulle, Germany, 2003
- ALA Best Book for Young Adults 2003
- IRA Young Adults' Choices for 2004
- Volunteer State Young Adult Book Award, 2004–05
- Nevada Young Reader's Award in the Young Adult category, 2005
- Senior Young Readers Choice Award, Pacific Northwest Library Association, 2005
- Sequoyah Young Adult Award for 2005
- Grand Canyon Reader Teen Award, 2005
- South Carolina Association of School Librarians Junior Book Award, 2005–2006
- Young Hoosier Book Award Middle Grades, 2006
