= Maria Luisa Alanis Ruiz =

American academic and activist

Maria Luisa Alanis Ruiz (born 1948) is an American Chicana activist and academic in Oregon. She has been active in Chicano and Latino social justice work in the state of Oregon since the 1970s, helped found Portland's Cinco de Mayo festival, and has been a long-term volunteer for the Portland-Guadalajara Sister-City Association. Much of her academic career was spent developing Chicano and Latino Studies programming and curricula for Portland State University.

== Early life and education ==
Born in 1948 in Linares, Mexico, Alanis Ruiz spent parts of her childhood living with her grandmother Maria Luisa "Lichita" in Monterrey. Raised a Catholic, her family consisted of her mother, father, Maria, four brothers, and three sisters. Her father struggled to support the family with little work in Linares; when he received United States citizenship in 1954, the family moved to Matamoros, Mexico, just across the border from Brownsville, Texas. The family lived as a trans-border family for seven years while her father worked in the United States and Alanis Ruiz learned English from a school in Brownsville while she lived in Matamoros.

Alanis Ruiz was 18 years old when her father obtained legal U.S. residency for the rest of the family. They lived in Brownsville before moving to Oregon for better work opportunities; they moved to Eola Village, the largest migrant labor camp with a population of 5,000 workers. During her two years as a farm worker she became interested in activism and labor organizing.

She spent 11 months working in the McMinnville, Oregon Diane's Foods factory. Her family moved to Woodburn, Oregon, but when they moved out of state for better work opportunities she remained in Eugene, Oregon to attend the University of Oregon.

Alanis Ruiz was recruited by graduate students Felipe Cañeda and Alfonso Cabrera to join the University of Oregon's High School Equivalency Program in 1970. Along with other migrant workers, she obtained her GED in the program and received a scholarship to study at the Language Institute at Oregon State University. After she completed the program, she enrolled at the University of Oregon, receiving her diploma in 1976. She went on to receive a Master of Science in Education Administration and Policy Foundations from Portland State University in 1998.

== Academic career ==
Alanis Ruiz spent several years as a recruiter for Colegio César Chávez until her departure in 1980. She took a position in the admissions office at Portland State University and held many roles in the admissions department at the university, including Affirmative Action Program Admissions Counselor and Assistant Admissions Director.

Alanis Ruiz was involved in the creation of the PSU Chicano-Latino studies certificate in 1995, serving as the program's Associate Director. After the death of the program's director in 1998, she temporarily took the position of Interim Director. Her role involved developing curricula, teaching classes, and advising student groups including PSU's MEChA chapter. In 2004, she decided to leave the PSU Chicano-Latino Studies Program resulted in her transfer, citing differences between her identity as a Chicana feminist and the male-centered Chicano-Latino Studies curriculum.

She took a position as the Director of Latino Community Relations in the College of Liberal Arts. In 2011, she retired from Portland State University after 31 years of service.

== Activism and higher education ==
Alanis Ruiz became involved with the Chicano Movement in the 1970s at the University of Oregon's Chicano Student Union; she joined Movimiento Estudantil Chicano de Aztlan (MEChA), an organization she would remain involved in for many years. Alanis Ruiz was active in the farm worker movement, the urban struggle for education, and the anti-war movement while attending the University of Oregon.

Identifying with the movement's ties to migrant Mexican American farm workers, Alanis Ruiz went on to become a leader in Chicano groups in Oregon. After graduating for the University of Oregon, Alanis Ruiz was hired as a recruiter for Colegio César Chávez, a Chicano college in Mount Angel, Oregon. She remained at Colegio César Chávez through several years before departing in 1980. She helped found Las Mujeres de Oregon, a grassroots community-building organization for women in Oregon, in 1980. She became the director of the student-organized Migrant Worker Party (MWP), a group that provided support and services for migrant workers; her work with the MWP included forcing a health inspection at a labor camp that resulted in the closure of the camp.

She used her experiences as a disadvantaged student to develop the Si Se Puede program at Portland State University; the program helped to decrease high drop out rates for Portland-area Latino high school students by exposing them to successful Latino community members. While working at Portland State University, she organized the Scholarship Gala annually for 13 years starting in 1997; the gala raised money to fund hundreds of $1,000 scholarships to Portland State University. She worked with TRIO Talent Search through Portland Community College to support disadvantaged high school students and put them on a path to college.

She was the founding Second Vice President of the Portland Chapter of the Mexican-American Women's National Association; organized in 1992, the group exposed Mexican American women to different topics like financial skills.

After retiring, Alanis Ruiz founded Sin Fronteras, which is an education consulting firm that works with school districts to provide parent education programming.

== Portland-Guadalajara Sister City Association ==
Alanis Ruiz is a founder and former president of the Portland-Guadalajara Sister City Association (PGSCA). Founded in 1983, the PGSCA supports initiatives to support both Portland, OR, and Guadalajara, Mexico. Alanis Ruiz helped found Portland's annual Cinco de Mayo Festival with the PGSCA in 1985. The festival started with a movie screening and a few musicians in Portland's Waterfront Park, with around 500 participants; in 2008, 300,000 people attended the festival.

Alanis Ruiz also helped develop several projects in Guadalajara with the PGSCA. Those included the Jardin Portland, a replica garden of Portland landmarks in El Bosque Las Coloros; Villas Mira Valle, an orphanage; El Colegío Unico, a culinary program; and the Bombero firefighter exchange program. Alanis Ruiz traveled to Guadalajara in 2007 with the PGSCA to attend Guadalajara's first Portland Festival.
