= Nancy Farmer =

American writer (born 1941)

- Born: July 9, 1941 (age 85); Phoenix, Arizona, U.S.
- Education: Reed College (BA)
- Occupation: Writer
- Spouse: Harold Farmer
- Children: 1
- Writing career
- Genres: Children's literature, young adult literature, fantasy and science fiction
- Notable works: The Ear, the Eye, and the Arm; A Girl Named Disaster; The House of the Scorpion; Sea of Trolls series
- Notable awards: National Book Award; 2002; Buxtehuder Bulle; 2003; Newbery Honor; 1995, 1997, 2003
- Website: www.nancyfarmer.weebly.com

Nancy Farmer (born 1941) is an American writer of children's and young adult books and science fiction. She has written three Newbery Honor books and won the U.S. National Book Award for Young People's Literature for The House of the Scorpion, published by Atheneum Books for Young Readers in 2002.

== Early life ==
Farmer was born in Phoenix, Arizona. She earned her B.A. at Reed College (1963) and later studied chemistry and entomology at the University of California, Berkeley. She enlisted in the Peace Corps (1963–1965), and subsequently worked in Mozambique and Rhodesia (present-day Zimbabwe), where she studied biological methods of controlling the tsetse fly between 1975 and 1978.

== Career ==
Farmer began writing in the 1980s, at the age of 40, while still living in Zimbabwe. She began writing stories in Africa. It was for one of those stories that she won the Writers of the Future contest, which enabled her to move back to the United States and begin writing full-time. Her experiences in Africa would go on to influence her writing.

== Personal life ==
Farmer met her husband, Harold Farmer, at the University of Rhodesia (now the University of Zimbabwe). They married after a week-long courtship in 1976. They have one son, Daniel.

As of 2010, Farmer lives in Arizona's Chiricahua Mountains with her husband.

== Bibliography ==
=== Novels ===
- Lorelei: The Story of a Bad Cat (Harare, Zimbabwe: College Press, 1987)
- The Eye, the Ear, and the Arm (College Press, 1989)
- Tapiwa's Uncle (College Press, 1993)
- Do You Know Me, illustrated by Shelley Jackson (Orchard Books, 1993)
- The Ear, the Eye and the Arm (Orchard, 1994)
- The Warm Place (Orchard, 1995)
- A Girl Named Disaster (Orchard, 1996)
- The House of the Scorpion (Atheneum Books, 2002)
- A New Year's Tale (2013) – paperback and e-book for adults
- The Lord of Opium (2013) – sequel to The House of the Scorpion

==== The Sea of Trolls trilogy ====
- The Sea of Trolls (Atheneum, 2004)
- The Land of the Silver Apples (Atheneum, 2007)
- The Islands of the Blessed (Atheneum, 2009)

=== Picture books ===
- Runnery Granary, illus. Jos. A. Smith (Greenwillow Books, 1996) – A Mystery Must Be Solved—Or the Grain is Lost!
- Casey Jones's Fireman: The Story of Sim Webb, illus. James Bernardin (New York: Phyllis Fogelman Books, 1999)
- Clever Ali, illus. Gail De Marcken (Orchard, 2006)

=== Short stories ===
- "The Mirror", L. Ron Hubbard Presents Writers of the Future, Volume IV (1988), pp. 35–65 – collection of twelve 1987 finalists; "The Mirror" won the grand prize
- "Tapiwa's Uncle", Cricket (February 1992)
- "Origami Mountain", The Year's Best Fantasy and Horror: Sixth Annual Collection (1992)
- "Falada: the Goose Girl's Horse", A Wolf At the Door, eds. Ellen Datlow and Terri Windling (2000)
- "Remember Me", Firebirds: An Anthology of Original Fantasy and Science Fiction, ed. Sharyn November (2003)
- "Bella's Birthday Present", Can You Keep a Secret, ed. Lois Metzger (2007)
- "The Mole Cure", Fantasy and Science Fiction (August 2007)
- "Ticket to Ride", Firebirds Soaring: An Anthology of Original Speculative Fiction, ed. Sharyn November (2008)
- "Castle Othello", Troll's Eye View, eds. Ellen Datlow and Terri Windling (2009)

== Awards ==
"The Mirror" (1987)

- 1988, Writers of the Future Grand Prize

The Ear, the Eye and the Arm (1994)

- 1995 Newbery Honor Book (a Newbery Medal runner-up)
- 1995, Hal Clement Award (Golden Duck Award, Young Adult)

A Girl Named Disaster (1996)

- 1996, National Book Award (U.S.) finalist, Young People's Literature
- 1997, Newbery Honor

The House of the Scorpion (2002)

- 2002, National Book Award for Young People's Literature
- 2003, Newbery Honor
- 2003, Buxtehuder Bulle (Germany)
- 2003, Printz Honor

The Land of the Silver Apples (2007)

- 2007, Emperor Norton Award ("extraordinary invention and creativity unhindered by the constraints of paltry reason")
