= Aztlán =

Legendary ancestral home of the Aztec

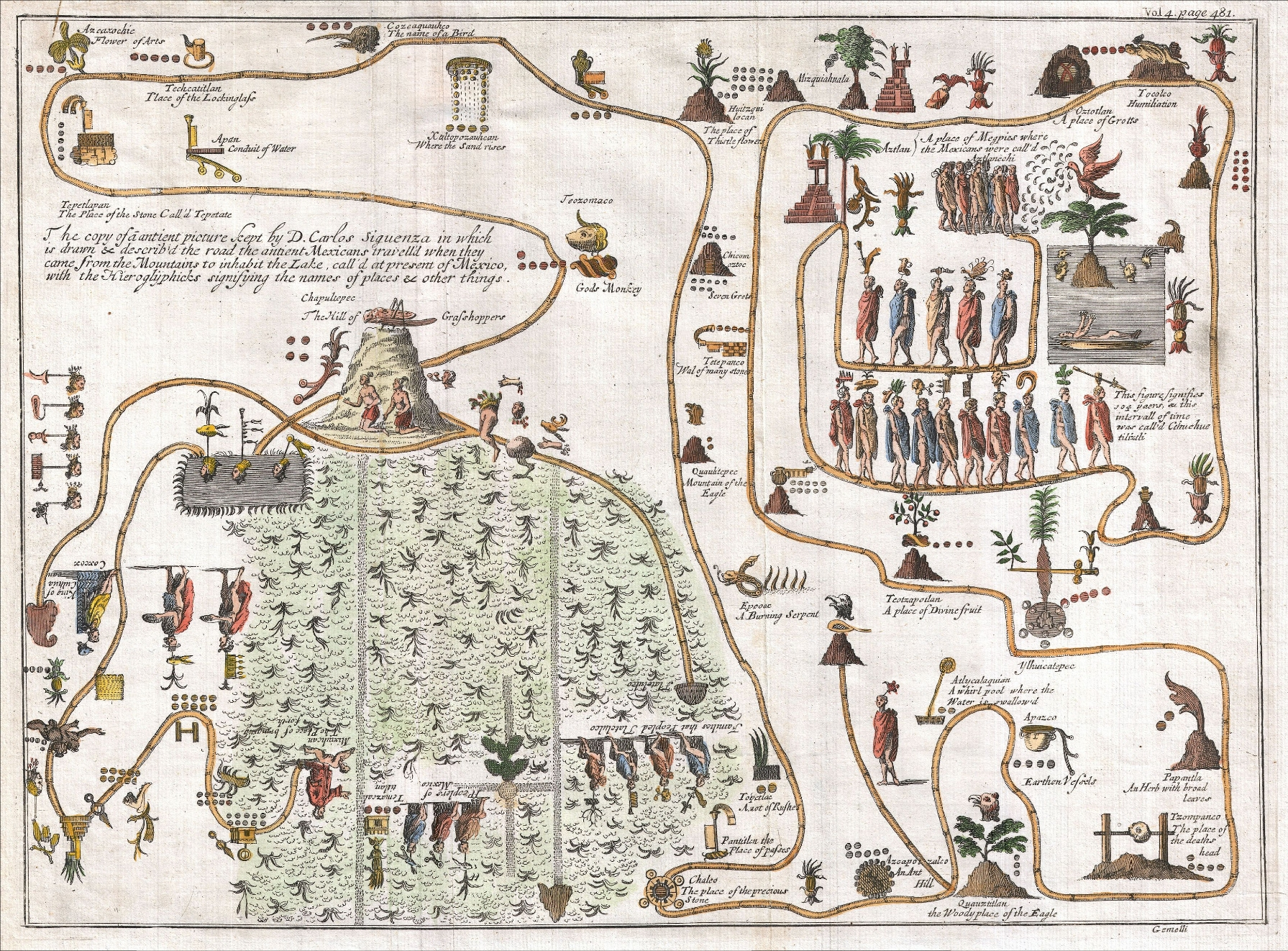
Map of the migration from Aztlán to Chapultepec

Aztlán (from Nahuatl languages: Aztlán, Nahuatl pronunciation: [ˈast͡ɬãːn̥]) is the mythical home of the Aztec peoples. The word "Aztec" was derived from the Classical Nahuatl aztecah (sing. aztecatl), meaning "people from Aztlán." Aztlán is mentioned in several ethnohistorical sources dating from the colonial period, and while each cites varying lists of the different tribal groups who participated in the migration from Aztlán to central Mexico, the Mexica who later founded Mexico-Tenochtitlan are mentioned in all of the accounts.

Historians have speculated about the possible location of Aztlán and tend to place it either in northwestern Mexico or the Southwestern United States, although whether Aztlán represents a real location or a mythological one is a matter of debate.

== History ==
Mexica histories relate that seven tribes lived in Chicomoztoc, or "the Place of the Seven Caves". Each cave represented a different Nahua group: the Xochimilca, Tlahuica, Acolhua, Tlaxcalteca, Tepaneca, Chalca, and Mexica. Along with these people, the Olmeca-Xicallanca and Xaltocamecas are also said to come from Aztlán. Because of their common linguistic origin, those groups are termed collectively "Nahualteca" (Nahua people). These tribes subsequently left the caves and settled "near" Aztlán.

The various descriptions of Aztlán apparently contradict each other. While some legends describe Aztlán as a paradise, the Codex Aubin says that the Aztecs were subject to a tyrannical elite named the Azteca Chicomoztoca. Guided by their priest, the Aztec tribe fled. On the road, their god Huitzilopochtli forbade them to call themselves Azteca, telling them that they should be known as Mexica. Scholars of the 19th century—in particular Alexander von Humboldt and William H. Prescott—translated the word Azteca, as is shown in the Aubin Codex, to Aztec.

The southward migration is estimated to have begun on May 24, 1064 CE, based on the dates of the supernova Crab Nebula from May to July 1054. Each of the seven groups is credited with founding a different major city-state in Central Mexico.

A 2004 translation of the Anales de Tlatelolco gives the only known date related to the exit from Aztlán; day-sign "4 Cuauhtli" (Four Eagle) of the year "1 Tecpatl" (Knife) or 1064–1065, and correlated to January 4, 1065.

Cristobal del Castillo mentions in his book "Fragmentos de la Obra General Sobre Historia de los Mexicanos", that the lake around the Aztlán island was called Metztliapan or "Lake of the Moon." Another version reads:

One day a man heard a bird calling to him, saying, "Go now, go now." When the man told the chief about the bird, the chief was relieved. He had known his people must find a new land, their own land, but had waited for a sign. So the people gathered and began a long march. They followed an idol of Huitzilopochtli that the priests carried. As they went, Huitzilopochtli spoke through the priests and prepared the people for the greatness of their empire to come. He explained that they should travel until they came to a large lake; there, they should look for another sign—an eagle in a cactus.

The journey took 200 years, and the people settled for a while in the Toltec capital of Tollan. Some people stayed in Tollan and some moved on. From time to time, Huitzilopochtli changed himself into a white eagle to inspire the people, and they traveled until they came to Lake Texcoco and saw a great eagle sitting on a cactus, holding a serpent. There they built Tenochtitlán, the city that became the capital and center of the Aztec empire.

== Places postulated as Aztlán ==
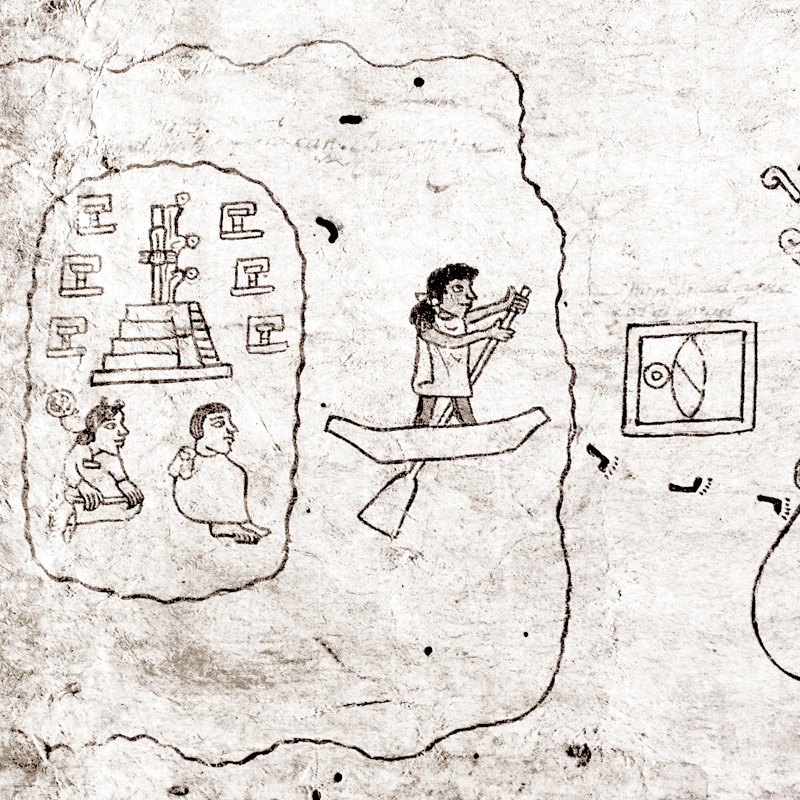
Depiction of the departure from Aztlán from an island in the 16th-century Codex Boturini. Aztlán is also depicted as some island in the Aubin and Azcatitlan codices.

Friar Diego Durán (c. 1537–1588) who chronicled the history of the Aztecs wrote of the Aztec emperor, Moctezuma I's, attempt to recover the history of the Mexica by congregating warriors and wise men on an expedition to locate Aztlán. According to Durán, the expedition was successful in finding a place that offered characteristics unique to Aztlán. However, his accounts were written soon after the conquest of Tenochtitlán and before an accurate mapping of the American continent was made; therefore, he was unable to provide a precise location.

During the 1960s, Mexican intellectuals began to seriously speculate about the possibility that Mexcaltitán de Uribe in Nayarit was the mythical city of Aztlán. One of the first to consider Aztlán being associated with the island was historian Alfredo Chavero towards the end of the 19th century. Historical investigators after his death tested his proposition and considered it valid, among them Wigberto Jiménez Moreno. This hypothesis is still debated.

Some scholars argue it is nearly or completely impossible to find the true location of Aztlán, due to all the conflicting accounts and narratives.

== Etymology ==
The meaning of the name Aztlán is uncertain. One suggested meaning is "place of Herons" or "place of egrets"—the explanation given in the Crónica Mexicáyotl—but this is not possible under Nahuatl morphology: "place of egrets" is Aztatlan. Other proposed derivations include "place of whiteness" and "at the place in the vicinity of tools", sharing the āz- element of words such as teponāztli, "drum" (from tepontli, "log").

== Used as symbolism by the Chicano movement ==
Territories considered for "Aztlán" by the Chicano movement.

The concept of Aztlán as the place of origin of Mexican civilization has become a rallying symbol for various Chicano nationalist movements.

In 1969 the notion of Aztlán was introduced by the poet Alurista (Alberto Baltazar Urista Heredia) at the National Chicano Youth Liberation Conference held in Denver, Colorado by the Crusade for Justice. There he read a poem, which has come to be known as the preamble to El Plan de Aztlán or as "El Plan Espiritual de Aztlán" due to its poetic aesthetic. For some Chicanos, Aztlán refers to the Mexican territories conquered by the United States as a result of the Mexican–American War of 1846–1848. Aztlán became a symbol for activists who allege that they have a legal and primordial right to the land. Some promoters of the Chicanos propose that a new ethnocentric government overthrow and replace the respective United States governments in the Southwest region, a República del Norte.

Aztlán is also the name of the Chicano studies journal published by the UCLA Chicano Studies Research Center.

Aztlán has been used for Chicanos to associate with their heritage and past. The myth has become a sort of shared memory that has united many people in the diasporic community. Much of the land had already been occupied by Spanish and Mexican colonists as documented in the Treaty of Guadalupe Hidalgo signed subsequent to the Mexican-American War. Like the Aztecs, Mexican-Americans migrated out of their homeland to seek a better life or more opportunities. Some Chicanos feel that they are repeating what their ancestors did or at least they feel a symbolic association with the myth. Many Chicanos simply consider Aztlán as a spiritual guiding force rather than a tangible location.

=== Movements that use or formerly used the concept of Aztlán ===
- Brown Berets
- MEChA (Movimiento Estudiantil Chicano de Aztlán, "Chicano Student Movement of Aztlán")
- Plan Espiritual de Aztlán
- Raza Unida Party
- Freedom Road Socialist Organization, which calls for self-determination for the Chicano nation in Aztlán up to and including the right to secession.

== In popular culture ==
=== In literature ===
"Aztlán" has been used as the name of speculative fictional future states that emerge in the southwestern United States or Mexico after their governments suffer a collapse or major setback; examples appear in such works as the novels Heart of Aztlán (1976), by Rudolfo Anaya; Warday (1984), by Whitley Strieber and James Kunetka; The Peace War (1984), by Vernor Vinge; The House of the Scorpion (2002), by Nancy Farmer; and World War Z (2006), by Max Brooks; as well as the role-playing game Shadowrun, in which the Mexican government was usurped by the Aztechnology Corporation (1989). In Gary Jennings' novel Aztec (1980), the protagonist resides in Aztlán for a while, later facilitating contact between Aztlán and the Aztec Triple Alliance just before Hernán Cortés' arrival.

"Strange Rumblings in Aztlan" is an article written by Hunter S. Thompson that appeared in the April 29, 1971 issue of Rolling Stone. The article is about the death of civil rights activist Ruben Salazar in East Los Angeles during a Vietnam War protest.

== See also ==
- List of mythological places

== Bibliography ==
- Andrews, J. Richard (2003). Introduction to Classical Nahuatl (revised ed.). Norman: University of Oklahoma Press. ISBN 0-8061-3452-6. OCLC 50090230.
- Smith, Michael E. (1997). The Aztecs (first ed.). Malden, MA: Blackwell Publishing. ISBN 978-0-631-23015-1. OCLC 48579073.
