= Plan Espiritual de Aztlán =

1969 Chicano nationalist manifesto

The Plan Espiritual de Aztlán (English: "Spiritual Plan of Aztlán") was a pro-indigenist manifesto advocating Chicano nationalism and self-determination for Mexican Americans. It was adopted by the First National Chicano Youth Liberation Conference, a March 1969 convention hosted by Rodolfo Gonzales's Crusade for Justice in Denver, Colorado.

== Background ==
In 1848, the Mexican–American War created the Xicano with the signing of the Treaty of Guadalupe Hidalgo on Feb 2 of that year. In a land colonized by three European/Western nations (Spain, France and the United States), the original occupants of these lands began to rebuild their own national identity, an identity focused on ancient ties to the occupied Americas and indigeneity. Ernesto Mireles says, "For the portion of the Xicano/a community engaged in resistance writing, the necessities of survival under colonial rule have overshadowed Aztlán and its mythology for centuries." The tie to the land known as Aztlan (Southwest United States, Northern Mexico) had emerged in the contemporary Xicano Movement as a pre-Cuauhtemoc trope and gives claim of this occupied territory to Xicano and Indigenous peoples. Beginning with the Chicano power movement of the 1960s and 70s the Xicano re-emerged as indigenous and no longer a foreigner of their own land.

The Xicano power movement of the 1960s and 1970s was a continuation of the centuries-old question surrounding the natural inheritance of indigenous people and national identity. This conversation around Indigenous national liberation and the expulsion of foreign invaders has a long history over the past 500 years. The Provisional Directorate of the Plan of San Diego, Texas written in 1915 states, "we will arise in arms against the government, and country of the United States of North America, one as all and all as one, proclaiming the liberty of the individuals of the black race and its independence of yankee tyranny which has held us in iniquitous slavery since remote times". This plan was written as the battle of the west started to come to a close and the settling was almost done. This is one declaration of a sovereignty prior to the plan de Aztlan by a formerly sovereign people that continues the discussion of natural inheritance.

== National liberation ==
El Plan Espiritual de Aztlan is about national liberation. Aztlan is only good to build power for the Xicano Movement. As Corky Gonzalez quotes,

”The publication of a revolutionary paper is equal to the taking of a city. The proclamation of a political plan is the same as the bloodiest combat. . . they form equal parts of a rebellion and are inherent in it. . . I have never seen, nor will I ever see a revolution without the propagation of ideas as a preliminary, and the shedding of blood, as the inevitable means of deciding the outcome” Cultural and political mobilization is the goal of this document. The idea of Aztlan has survived numerous conquests and hundreds of years of settler-colonial oppression which means the tie to land and indigeneity is the engine to mobilization.

The goal of national mobilization is to create a nation a return to history. Declaring full sovereignty of the south west from the settler nation of the United States of America. The revolutionary caucus of the 1969 Chicano Youth Conference states,

“We, a non-conquered people living in a conquered land, come together hoping that a plan of liberation, a concrete revolutionary program acceptable to the entire southwest, will from this conference. Subjected to a system that has denied our human dignity, our rights are also being denied under a constitution which we had no part in formulating but more fundamentally the rights protected under the Guadalupe-Hidalgo treaty which grants the right to cultural autonomy have been violated. For 144 years we have been trying to peacefully coexist yet no peace has come to our communities. Revolution is the only means available to us. We owe no allegiance, no respect, to any of the laws of this racist country. Our liberation struggle is a war of Survival.” The Revolutionary caucus is calling for action such as described in El Plan Espiritual de Aztlan. They are calling for the complete succession of Xicano and Indigenous land from a nation that does not recognize them as fully human.

Succession only works with the complete national sovereignty of a people and fully removed for the structure created to oppress the Indigenous / Xicano. The creation of a new national identity and the creation of a nation. It is laid out by Gonzalez as,

“La Crusada Para La Justicia exists as an expression of some members of La Raza consciously creating social systems that are parallel to and independent of the anglo systems imposed by war, annexation, and conquest. It offers a wide range of services: education, counseling, legal, medical, and financial: it focuses as a center for art, music, and drama: it builds barrio identity, political power, economic muscle.” This statement offers Xicanos / Xicanas a basis of what to accomplish and how to build power for the Xicano / Indigenous communities.

Aztlan is firmly the idea of indigeneity and natural inheritance to a land stolen by occupying power. Aztlan gives the Xicano / Indigenous community power to build national liberation movement. Rodolfo Gonzalez writes, “Aztlan, a mythical land of the Aztecs? Aztlan an abstract illusion of a Nation? Aztlan a common denominator that la gente de La Raza, the mestizo, the Chicano can agree upon is not based on a phantasma of romantic delusions it is conceived on the foundations of history and the reality of its existence can and will be proven by law; not a law based on political courts of injustice and cold anglo legalities, but based on human fact and historical inheritance.” In other words, Aztlan means to build power, and this power is based on historical facts and rightness. The land of the Mexica, Dine, Hopi, Apache, Yaqui, Yavapai, and many more.

== Organizational goals ==
This list of organizational goals is pulled directly from the El Plan de Aztlan document itself.

"1. UNITY in the thinking of our people concerning the barrios, the pueblo, the campo, the land, the poor, the middle class, the professional-all committed to the liberation of La Raza.

2. ECONOMY: economic control of our lives and our communities can only come about by driving the exploiter out of our communities, our pueblos, and our lands and by controlling and developing our own talents, sweat, and resources. Cultural background and values which ignore materialism and embrace humanism will contribute to the act of cooperative buying and the distribution of resources and production to sustain an economic base for healthy growth and development Lands rightfully ours will be fought for and defended. Land and realty ownership will be acquired by the community for the people's welfare. Economic ties of responsibility must be secured by nationalism and the Chicano defense units.

3. EDUCATION must be relative to our people, i.e., history, culture, bilingual education, contributions, etc. Community control of our schools, our teachers, our administrators, our counselors, and our programs.

4. INSTITUTIONS shall serve our people by providing the service necessary for a full life and their welfare on the basis of restitution, not handouts or beggar's crumbs. Restitution for past economic slavery, political exploitation, ethnic and cultural psychological destruction and denial of civil and human rights. Institutions in our community which do not serve the people have no place in the community. The institutions belong to the people.

5. SELF-DEFENSE of the community must rely on the combined strength of the people. The front line defense will come from the barrios, the campos, the pueblos, and the ranchitos. Their involvement as protectors of their people will be given respect and dignity. They in turn offer their responsibility and their lives for their people. Those who place themselves in the front ranks for their people do so out of love and carnalismo. Those institutions which are fattened by our brothers to provide employment and political pork barrels for the gringo will do so only as acts of liberation and for La Causa. For the very young there will no longer be acts of juvenile delinquency, but revolutionary acts.

6. CULTURAL values of our people strengthen our identity and the moral backbone of the movement. Our culture unites and educates the family of La Raza towards liberation with one heart and one mind. We must insure that our writers, poets, musicians, and artists produce literature and art that is appealing to our people and relates to our revolutionary culture. Our cultural values of life, family, and home will serve as a powerful weapon to defeat the gringo dollar value system and encourage the process of love and brotherhood.

7. POLITICAL LIBERATION can only come through independent action on our part, since the two-party system is the same animal with two heads that feed from the same trough. Where we are a majority, we will control; where we are a minority, we will represent a pressure group; nationally, we will represent one party: La Familia de La Raza!"

== Origin and adoption ==
During the conference, a young poet named Alurista, born in Mexico but raised in San Diego, took the stage. To a captivated audience, he read the words,

In the spirit of a new people that is conscious not only of its proud historical heritage but also of the brutal "gringo" invasion of our territories, we, the Chicano inhabitants and civilizers of the northern land of Aztlan from whence came our forefathers, reclaiming the land of their birth and consecrating the determination of our people of the sun, declare that the call of our blood is our power, our responsibility, and our inevitable destiny.

The poem, El Plan Espiritual de Aztlán, became the title of the manifesto, and the poem became its preamble. Alurista went on to become the "poet laureate of Aztlán".

== See also ==
- Plan de Santa Barbara
- Huei tlamahuiçoltica
