= Chicano Youth Liberation Conference =

1969 conference in Denver, Colorado, US

Chicano Youth Liberation Conference was a conference held in Denver, Colorado, in March 1969. It is also called the Denver Youth Conference. This was the first large scale gathering of Chicano/a youth to discuss issues of oppression, discrimination, and injustice. Rodolfo "Corky" Gonzales and the Crusade for Justice were the main organizers, and they drafted and presented "El Plan Espiritual de Aztlan" at the conference, which played a major part in the national Chicano movement.

== Background ==
Chicano students faced discrimination in society, including schools. Mexican Americans "were being psychologically colonized, rejecting their cultural heritage for the Anglo-American values proliferated through the public educational system. The conference's response to US psychological aggression was the development of a new identity founded in cultural nationalism."

Students organized themselves across the country. Student organizations like the Mexican American Youth Organization and the United Mexican American Students had developed in Texas and California. Corky Gonzales was a main organizer in the Denver West High School walkouts, and his leadership gave him standing with youth in the area.

== First Conference ==
The conference took place from March 27 to 31, 1969.

Workshops focused on topics related to "Social Revolution" and "cultural" issues. These included creative workshops to create poetry, art, music, and writing, as well as lectures, seminars, and workshops about issues and problems for the Chicano community, organizational techniques, political philosophy, self defense, civil disobedience, and demonstration.

Approximately 1500 Mexican-American youths attended from across the United States.

Gonzales presented "El Plan Espiritual de Aztlan" at the conference, which energized the youth in the movement. The term "Chicanismo" was established.

Students planned a massive school walkout for September 16, which is Mexican Independence Day. Students organized the walkouts in California, Arizona, Texas, New Mexico, and Colorado.

Women at the conference held an impromptu workshop about the role of feminist liberation, and "[i]t was the consensus of the group that the Chicana woman does not want to be liberated." This statement is complex, because the understanding of feminism at the time was so tied to White women's liberation at the expense of other women. The declaration is a statement for Chicano nationalism and cultural ties, which rejects feminist concerns that could divide the movement.

== Outcomes ==
The most influential concept was El Plan Espiritual de Aztlan. Conference was a celebration rather than strategic meeting, "but no other event had so energized Chicanos for continued commitment."

Gonzales said the demonstrations were "not to have a cultural carnival" but provide political and educational understandings for people who attend.

== Second Conference ==
The second conference was held in March 1970. "Our New Nation is Born" was a resolution that revised and updated the original Plan de Aztlan. This document announced the National Chicano Moratorium in August 1970. The participants established the independent "La Raza Unida" political party.

Approximately 3000 people attended. This time, 18 states were represented by the participants, with over 100 organizations.

The Chicana workshop presented a resolution stating: "The Chicana women resolve not to separate but to strengthen Aztlan, the family of La Raza!"

== See also ==
- Chicana feminism
