= Chicano cinema =

Filmmaking style

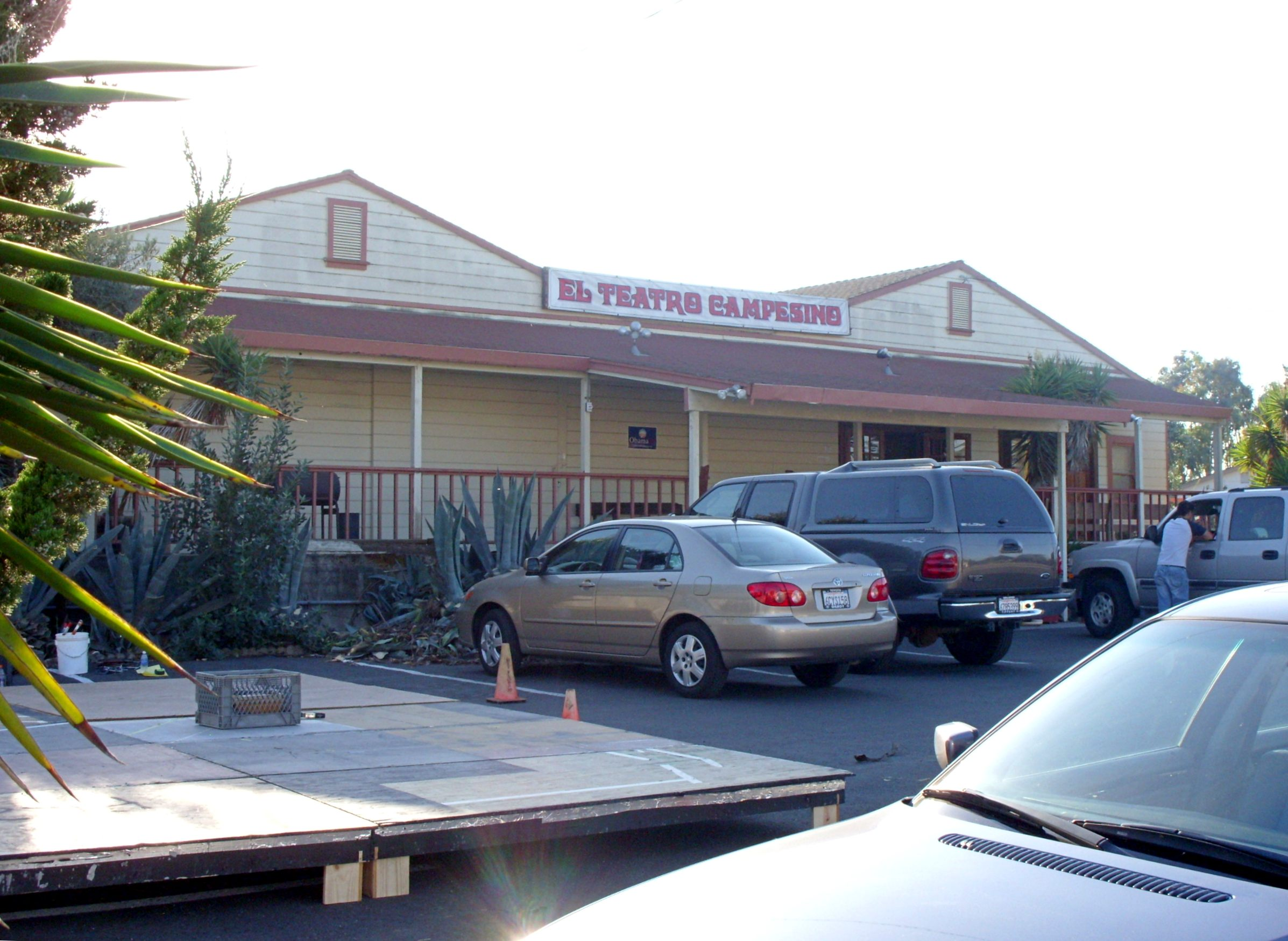
El Teatro Campesino (2008) was founded in 1965 and remains active as of 2023.

Chicano cinema is an aspect of Mexican American cinema that refers to the filmmaking practices that emerged out of the cultural consciousness developed through the Chicano Movement. Luis Valdez is generally regarded as the first Chicano filmmaker and El Teatro Campesino as the first theater company.

Chicano cinema is frequently set in the American Southwest, specifically the border states and in the southern region of California. A predominant focus of many Chicano movies is addressing stereotypes, as well as political and economic struggles of Chicanos in America.

== Background ==
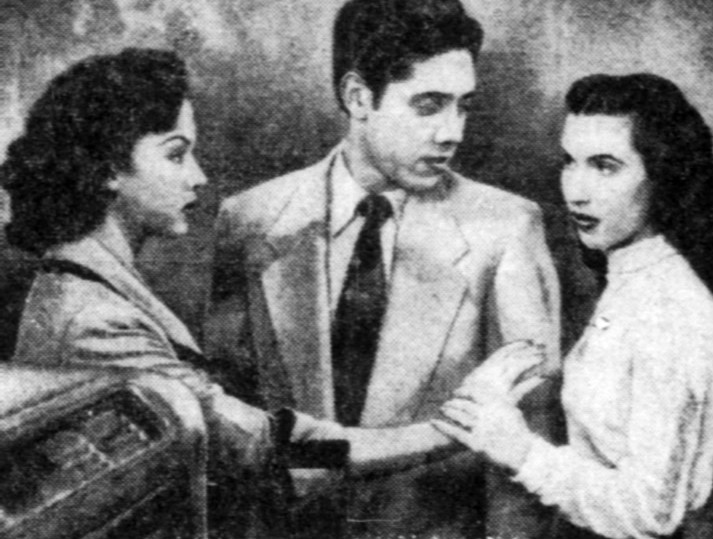
Photo from The Ring (1952). From left: Rita Moreno, Lalo Ríos, and Lillian Molieri.

Prior to the rise of Chicano consciousness, when representation was given in the industry, it was generally limited to a single Latin American being cast in a movie production. Early actors Myrtle Gonzalez, Beatriz Michelena, Frank Padilla, and Eustacio Montoya battled for roles in silent films. Qualified actors were overlooked because of their race or ethnicity and the restrictive discriminative barriers that pervaded the American film industry.

Mexican American and other Latin American actors of darker skin color were more stringently typecast or excluded from acting careers. Colorism was prominent. For example, Cuban actor Rene Cardona who was blonde was given the role of the Prince of Wales. Those of darker skin were often cast as stereotypical "banditos," "greasers" or "Indians" to navigate a career in the industry. These film stereotypes further perpetuated negative stereotypes of Mexican Americans.

By the early 1950s, a few films that focused on demonstrating more realistic or 'underdog' depictions of the Latin and Mexican American experience emerged, such as The Ring (1952) and Salt of the Earth (1954).

== History ==
Rooted in the Chicano Movement, some Mexican American youth reclaimed Chicana/o identity to assert cultural pride and resistance to cultural subjugation. The cinema that emerged alongside this movement demonstrated this resistance.

=== Origins: El Teatro Campesino ===
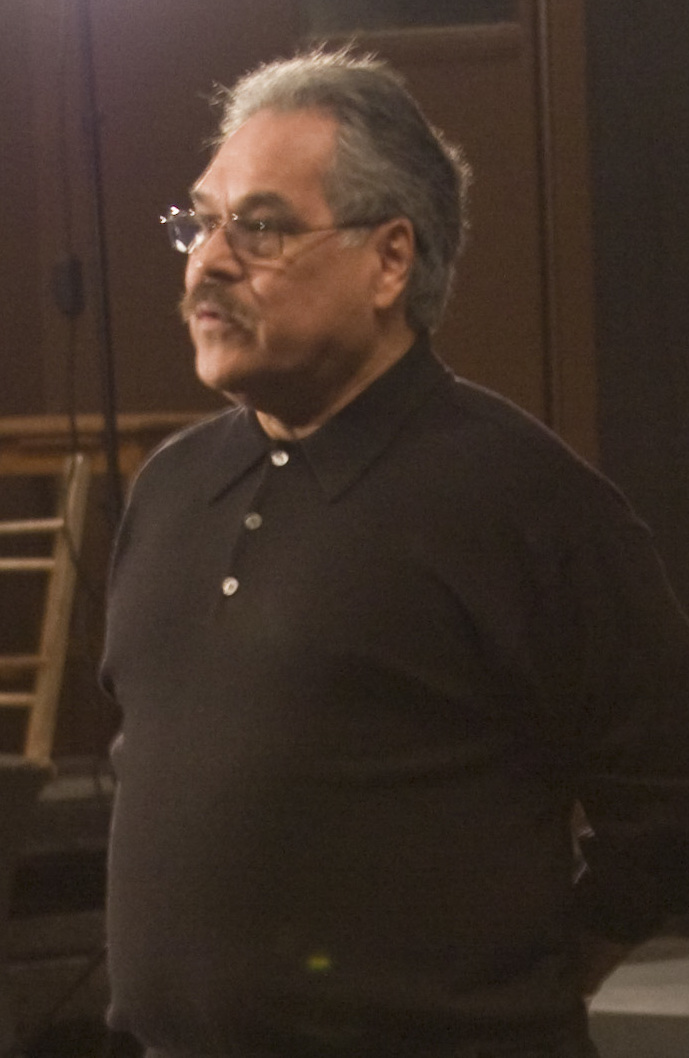
Luis Valdez (2008)

Chicano cinema emerged out of the playwriting and acting practices of Luis Valdez and El Teatro Campesino. The theater company was founded in 1965 out of a collaboration between Valdez and Agustin Lira, who had thought of using theater to advance the farmworker's political struggle for rights. Early productions were focused on spreading awareness about various political issues, such as the Delano grape strike (1965-67).

By the late 1960s, the theater group had aligned with the growing Chicano Movement, producing the short film I Am Joaquin (1969), directed by Luis Valdez and based on Rodolfo Gonzales' influential poem "Yo Soy Joaquin." Other short films produced in this period included Los Vendidos (1972) and El Corrido (1976). The work of El Teatro Campesino also inspired the formation of about thirty other Chicano theater groups by 1973, including Teatro Los Actores by Louie Olivos Jr. and Teatro de la Esperanza by Jorge A. Huerta. Huerta also later established the still operating Teatro Máscara Mágica in San Diego, California with William Virchis.

=== First Chicano feature films ===
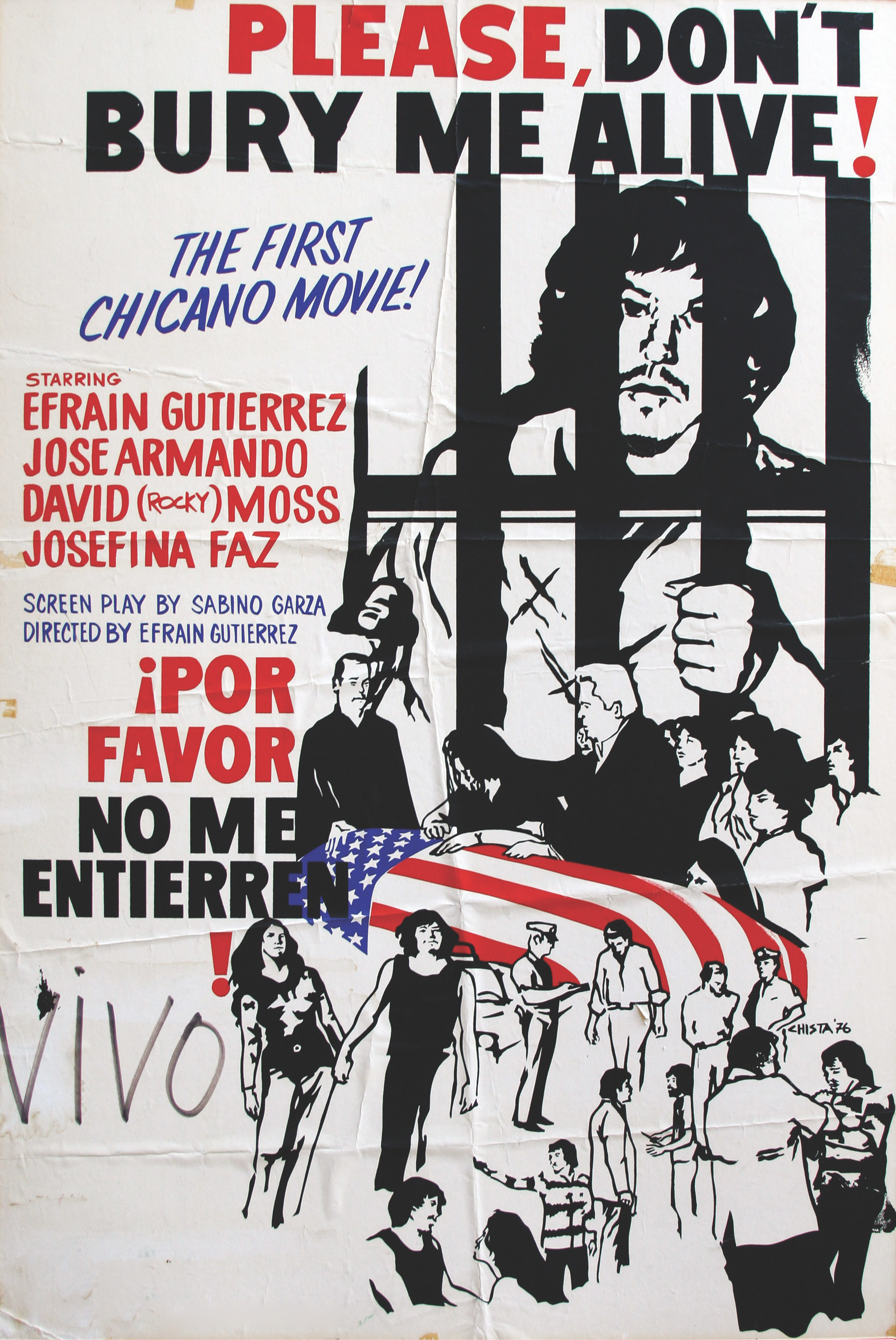
Please, Don't Bury Me Alive! (1976) film poster, widely considered the first full-length Chicano film.

The Chicano Movement was reflected in film, highlighting the highs and lows of the movement. Chicano filmmakers engaged in a fight against the Anglo-American stereotypes and manipulative imagery that showed them as primarily violent, simpleminded, unskilled, and lazy. These stereotypes were negatively affecting Chicanos' chances at acceptance into a growing economic, social, political, and American society.

This was portrayed in the first Chicano feature films Please, Don't Bury Me Alive! (1976), Alambrista! (1977), and Raíces de Sangre (1978). Short documentary films also expanded the scope of Chicano cinema, with Agueda Martinez: Our People, Our Country (1977) directed by Esperanza Vasquez, and nominated for an Academy Award for Best Documentary Short in 1978, as well as Chicana (1979) directed by Sylvia Morales.

=== Mainstream films ===
By the 1980s, Chicano cinema had begun to move into the mainstream of American popular culture. Integration of schools and culture was a major focus of many of these films. As these films became popular, they began to make more money, leading to larger studios creating more Chicano movies. Actors such as Edward James Olmos and Rosanna DeSoto began playing prominent roles in major movies, allowing for others to follow with successful film careers. As the Chicano community developed with more social activism and awareness, so did its cinema, leading to more diverse themes about oppression, integration, and ethnicity. Chicano cinema continues to thrive with the growth of representation and success of Chicanos and Chicanas in the movie industry.

== Representation ==
=== Chicano Representation ===
As found in lists of actors of Chicano Films, many Latinos of different backgrounds have been cast to portray Mexican-Americans in these films. More often than not, Chicanos were pleased to see a Latino face on the big screens, but on occasion, controversy would arise. An example of this was the casting of Puerto Rican-American actress, Jennifer Lopez, as the famous Mexican-American singer, Selena Quintanilla in the movie Selena (1997). Several advocacy groups protested the casting because the Tejano popstar was not being played by someone that was actually Mexican or Mexican-American. Still many Chicanos, including the late popstar's father, Abraham Quintanilla, believed the representation of any or all Latino cast should be celebrated. Cases of controversial casting like this one are still found in today's American Film Industry.

=== Chicano Image ===
The standard Chicano image in film was set by white American men which often portrayed Chicanos as lazy, promiscuous, and troubled. These stereotypes had been embedded into years of film, and because of this racial bias against Chicanos, the portrayal of Chicano characters in film generally reflected poorly on Chicanos as a people. The roles were usually antagonistic and crudely stereotypical. In the films Let Katie Do It (1916) and Martyrs of the Alamo (1915), Mexicans were portrayed as villains to justify the theft of Mexican land by Americans. The image of the Chicano continues to evolve, and this can be seen in films centered around the empowerment of Chicanos and the Chicano Movement.

== Film Style, Aesthetics, and Subject Matter ==
The style, aesthetics, and subject matter of Chicano cinema sets it apart as a film genre. Chicano movies use multicultural aesthetics to capture Chicano life and culture on film. Though various directors and producers have different cinematic styles, they use specific styles of cultural blending, characterizations, themes, and subject matters which have created a new Chicano cinematic aesthetic.

=== Chicano Gangs in Film ===
A number of Chicano films revolve around or include the theme of Chicano street gangs, especially those in large cities such as Los Angeles. Movies like Boulevard Nights (1979) and Walk Proud (1979) were early examples of Chicano gang culture representation in film which highlighted Chicano masculinity and loyalty. In the 1980s, the movies Zoot Suit (1981), Stand and Deliver (1988), and Colors (1988) each had gang related thematic elements, addressing the "troubled Chicano teenager" stereotype and gang involvement. Other significant Chicano gang movies include American Me (1992), Blood In, Blood Out (1993), Mi Vida Loca (1993), and My Family (1995). Films such as these often portrayed stereotypical Chicano gang members which perpetuated the stereotypical representation of male masculinity among the Chicano community. The term used to refer to this masculine pride is machismo. Chicano gang activity in film and music, specifically rap and hip hop, address violence, Chicano attitudes towards police, and Chicano incarceration. These films and the gang-related subject matter show this aspect of the Chicano experience and culture, including family ties and Chicano oppression.

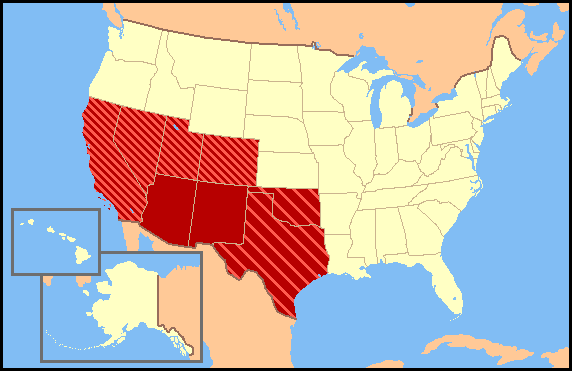
The American Southwest

=== Films Set in the American Southwest ===
Due to its proximity to Mexico, many Chicanos live in the American Southwest. Films of the 20th century reflected this. Movies like Tijerina (1969), Llanito (1972), Agueda Martinez (1978), The Lemon Grove Incident (1986), The Milagro Bean Field War (1988), La Llorona (1991), and Los Mineros (1991) are all examples of Chicano movies that were set in the American Southwest. These movies revolved around the Chicano experience in this region. Controversial Chicano films that focus on the Mexican border include Borderline (1980) and The Border (1982). These films often depicted Chicanos as inferior and as foils to the white characters. This grossly stereotypical representation was actively fought by Chicano directors and writers. Efforts to change the representation of the Southwest began after the Chicano Movement of the fifties and sixties as Chicano directors began creating films with the intent of accurately depicting the lives of Chicanos, Latinos, and Mexican-Americans in the American Southwest. While Southwest films are not as popular today, negative representation has been combatted in the last 30 years.

== Notable people ==
=== Directors ===
- Luis Valdez
- Efraín Gutiérrez
- Frank Zuniga
- Robert Rodriguez
- Gregory Nava
- Patricia Riggen
- Aurora Guerrero
- Jesús Salvador Trevino

=== Actors ===
- Lalo Rios
- Rosaura Revueltas
- Edward James Olmos
- Cheech Marin
- Richard Ynigue
- Daniel Valdez
- Rosanna DeSoto
- Paul Rodiriguez
- Enrique Castillo
- Lupe Ontiveros
- Seidy Lopez
- Angel Avilas
- Salma Hayek
- Anthony Quinn
- Micheal Peña
- Constance Marie Lopez
- George Lopez
- Danny Trejo
- Yareli Arizmendi
- Julio Cesar Cedillo
- Emily Rios
- Jesse Garcia
- Matthew Bonifacio
- Javier Hernandez
- Kate del Castillo
- Jacob Vargas
- Jeremy Ray Valdez
- Demian Bichir
- Eva Longoria
- Raul Castillo
- Aimee Garcia
- David Castañeda
- Raymond Cruz

=== Producers ===
- Moctesuma Esparza
- Carlos Gallardo
- Robert Rodriguez
- Abraham Quintanilla Jr.
- Gregory Nava

== See also ==
- Chicano films
- Chicano Movement
