= American Pachuco: The Legend of Luis Valdez =

2026 documentary film by David Alvarado

- Film poster
- Directed by: David Alvarado
- Written by: David Alvarado
- Produced by: David Alvarado; Lauren DeFilippo; Everett Katigbak; Amanda Pollak
- Narrated by: Edward James Olmos
- Cinematography: Zachary Fink
- Edited by: Daniel Chávez-Ontiveros
- Music by: Eduardo Arenas
- Production company: Insignia Films
- Release date: January 22, 2026 (Sundance)
- Running time: 92 minutes
- Country: United States
- Languages: English; Spanish
- Box office: $178,275

American Pachuco: The Legend of Luis Valdez is a 2026 American documentary film directed by David Alvarado. It chronicles the life and career of Luis Valdez, the playwright and director known as the father of Chicano theater.

The film is narrated by Edward James Olmos, who starred in Valdez's seminal work, Zoot Suit and the 1981 film adaptation. It premiered in the U.S. Documentary Competition at the 2026 Sundance Film Festival, where it won the U.S. Documentary Audience Award and Festival Favorite Award.

== Premise ==
The film explores how Luis Valdez transformed the American cultural landscape by bringing Chicano stories from the farm fields of Delano, California, to Broadway and Hollywood. It covers his founding of El Teatro Campesino alongside Cesar Chavez and the United Farm Workers, as well as the creation of his iconic works Zoot Suit and La Bamba.

The documentary utilizes split-screen visuals and is guided by a "Pachuco narrator" (Edward James Olmos) who provides candid commentary on Valdez's struggle against political resistance and industry skepticism.

== Production ==
The film is directed by David Alvarado, known for Bill Nye: Science Guy (2017). It is produced by Insignia Films. The score was composed by Eduardo Arenas, the bassist for the band Chicano Batman.

The film features never-before seen archival footage. The production team worked with the University of California, Santa Barbara to digitize over 80,000 feet of unseen footage of El Teatro Campesino that was at risk of deteriorating.

In November 2025, prior to its festival premiere, the film was awarded the Library of Congress Lavine/Ken Burns Prize for Film, which included a $200,000 grant for post-production. Filmmaker Ken Burns praised the project as "joyful" and noted that it "illuminates a figure whose career in the arts broke down barriers."

== Release ==
American Pachuco: The Legend of Luis Valdez premiered in the U.S. Documentary Competition at the 2026 Sundance Film Festival, where it won the Audience Award and the Festival Favorite Award.

On February 3, 2026, the film made its NYC premiere at DOC NYC, kicking off the prestigious Selects Series. The screening was followed by a Q&A with director David Alvarado, producer Lauren DeFilippo, and film subject Lou Diamond Phillips. American Pachuco is screening in festivals around the country, including the 2026 Full Frame Documentary Film Festival in April.

American Pacucho: The Legend of Luis Valdez will make its broadcast premiere in the fall of 2026 on PBS as a co-presentation of VOCES and American Masters.

== Reception ==
On the review aggregator website Rotten Tomatoes, 96% of 26 critics' reviews are positive, with an average rating of 7.1/10. The website's consensus reads: "Celebratory by design, American Pachuco: The Legend of Luis Valdez finds renewed urgency in its subject's pioneering fusion of Chicano art, identity, and activism." Metacritic, which uses a weighted average, assigned the film a score of 72 out of 100, based on nine critics, indicating "generally favorable" reviews.

Critics have generally praised American Pachuco as a lively, enlightening, and educational film.
