= Eppie Archuleta =

American weaver (1922–2014)

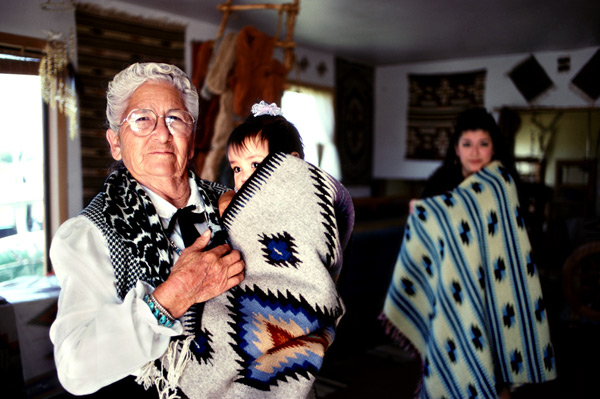
- Archuleta (left) in 1985
- Born: Epifania Martinez; January 6, 1922; Santa Cruz, New Mexico, U.S.
- Died: April 11, 2014 (aged 92); Española, New Mexico, U.S.
- Occupation: Weaver
- Children: 8
- Mother: Agueda Salazar Martinez

Epifania "Eppie" Archuleta (January 6, 1922 – April 11, 2014) was an American weaver and textile artisan at the annual Spanish Market in Santa Fe, New Mexico. While the more traditional Chimayo and Rio Grande tapestries used diamonds and stripes in their designs. Archuleta specialized in more contemporary woven designs. Archuleta was a recipient of a 1985 National Heritage Fellowship awarded by the National Endowment for the Arts, which is the United States government's highest honor in the folk and traditional arts. She was inducted into the Colorado Women's Hall of Fame in 1997.

== Early life ==
Epifania Martinez was born to weaver Agueda Salazar Martinez and Eusebio Martinez, in Santa Cruz, New Mexico, on Epiphany, January 6, 1922. Archuleta, who was raised in Española and Medanales, New Mexico, was the fifth-generation of master weavers in her family. Her father was a schoolteacher who later became the postmaster in Medanales; he was a weaver as well. As a child, Archuleta said she didn't really enjoy weaving but it was necessary for her and her nine siblings to participate in the process to help support the large family. The children also worked on the family farm.

== Career ==
Archuleta purchased a wool mill in 1989, which she opened as the San Luis Valley Wool Mill. She produced wool yarn, which she sold to weavers throughout the United States.

She also worked as an instructor for both the Los Artes del Valle crafts cooperative and the Virginia Neal Blue Women's Resource Center, "which were established in the late 1950s to boost the local economy. These programs facilitated a revival of weaving and embroidery in the Valley and helped Archuleta and others to continue their work."

Archuleta was profiled in a January 1991 article in National Geographic magazine. She was awarded the master's award for lifetime achievement from Spanish Market of Santa Fe in 2001. (Her sister, Cordelia Coronado, was also a recipient of the Spanish Market's lifetime award that same year). She was also a guest at the 1993 inauguration of U.S. President Bill Clinton and was honored at the White House. In 1995, Archuleta received an honorary Doctorate of Arts from Adams State University in Alamosa, Colorado. She was also the subject of a 2004 book titled Eppie Archuleta and the Tale of Juan de la Burra.

== Personal life ==
In October 1940, she married Francisco Archuleta. The couple moved to the San Luis Valley of Colorado in 1951, where Francisco worked as a farmer and rancher. Archuleta had ten children, eight of whom lived to adulthood. The Archuletas later moved to a ranch in Capulin, Colorado, where she built a small home next to a wool mill. She also resided in La Jara, Colorado.

Archuleta died on April 11, 2014, at Espanola Hospital in Española, New Mexico, at the age of 92. By 2001, she had 36 grandchildren and 18 great-grandchildren. Her survivors included her daughter, Norma Medina, who is also a master weaver.
