= Los Vendidos =

Play by Luis Valdez

Los Vendidos (Spanish for The Sold Ones or The Sellouts) is a one-act play by Chicano playwright Luis Valdez, a founding member of El Teatro Campesino. He wrote it in 1967, and it was first performed at the Brown Beret junta in Elysian Park, East Los Angeles. The play examines stereotypes of Latinos in California and how they are treated by local, state, and federal governments.

== Plot ==
The short play is set in Honest Sancho's Used Mexican Lot and Mexican Curio Shop, a fictional Californian store that apparently sells various "models" (robots) of stereotypical Mexicans and Mexican-Americans that buyers can manipulate by simply snapping their fingers and calling out commands. The action of the play revolves around "The Secretary", a character by the name of Miss Jiménez, who converses with Honest Sancho, the owner of the store. Sancho says her name with Spanish pronunciation ([xiˈmenes] or, roughly, hee-MEN-ess), though she chastises him for speaking bad English, demanding that it be pronounced as the Anglicized /ˈdʒɪmənɛz/ JIM-ə-nez.

Miss Jiménez explains to the courteous Honest Sancho that she is a secretary for Governor Reagan and that his administration is looking to purchase "a Mexican type" to appeal to a lower income crowd. Sancho shows the Secretary four different models, snapping his fingers in order to bring them to life and demonstrate their behaviors. Although Miss Jiménez is herself evidently a Chicana (Mexican-American), she seems completely ignorant to the cultural stereotypes displayed in each of the four buyable characters.

First, Sancho shows her the sturdy Farm Worker, but she refuses to buy him because he speaks no English. Second, they examine the "Johnny Pachuco", a 1950s Chicano gang member model who is violent, profane, and drug-abusing, though an easy scapegoat and perfect to brutalize. Third, when Miss Jiménez asks for a more romantic model, they come to the Revolucionario, one of the glorified bandit/martyrs of early Californian history; however, she denies him when she learns that he is completely Mexican and not even American-made.

Finally, they come to the most contemporary Mexican-American model, named "Eric Garcia": a well-dressed and exciting public speaker who is university-educated, ambitious, bilingual, and polite. Miss Jiménez very reluctantly agrees to buy Eric for $15,000, when suddenly he begins staging a vocal protest in Spanish: "¡Viva la raza! ¡Viva la huelga! ¡Viva la revolución!" (Long live the people! Long live the strike! Long live the revolution!). Soon he snaps the three other models awake and they join in his miniature uprising. After Jiménez flees in fright, the four models converse among each other, revealing that they, in fact, are not robots, but rather, living human beings. They leave the lot and share the money amongst themselves, and Sancho stays still; it is he who is the robot. One of the people take him for an oil job and the play ends.

== Analysis ==
Luiz Valdez wrote this play to enhance awareness to the different stereotypes in 1960 Americas, and how other people treated him. Luis Valdez himself was a Chicano and immigrant from Mexico.

The Sellouts are people who sell out their culture and adapt to the culture of Americans. Valdez himself saw this as a huge problem to immigrant workers as it made people of his kind, who kept their culture, look bad. In this case, it is Miss Jimenez who was the Sellout.

Another important breakdown of the play can be done through the lens of linguistic terrorism and assimilation. Miss. Jimenez is a perfect example of the process of linguistic assimilation or as others describe linguistic terrorism. The attack on the Spanish language is something that is seen very early on in the play. When Jimenez first introduces herself, she accentuates the “Anglo-fiction” of her name by changing the pronunciation. This is her way of not only assimilating into the Anglo culture around her but also an example of the rejection of her own language. This literary decision by Valdez can be seen as an example of linguistic assimilation. Valdez is trying to explain the notion that many Mexican immigrants and Mexican Americans face. The narrative that they are fed is that “proficiency in English is crucial to broader economic success” (Espinosa & Massey 1). It is this narrative that drives people closer to full assimilation into the Anglo-dominated Society of The United States. As generations begin to settle down in the country the idea of assimilation grows and as a result, people such as Jimenz begin to have more exposure and inclination to forget their roots and instead prioritize proficiency in English (Espinosa & Massey 44).

== Adaptation ==
Los Vendidos was adapted for television in 1972 by KNBC. The adaptation of the play was presented as a televised special of the original acto that was first performed by El Teatro Campesino. For the most part, the adaptation stays true to the original screenplay created by Valdez. The differences between the adaption and the original screenplay lie in the opening and closing scenes of the special. As the televised adaption begins the screen is presented with a pyramid lined with the actors of El Teatro Campesino. Stationed in the middle of the pyramid is an Aztec Calendar voiced by the creator of the play, Luiz Valdez. Valdez welcomes the audience and begins his explanation of the different actors on stage. Each actor is meant to be a depiction of the stereotypes that will be on display throughout the rest of the televised special. Towards the end of the televised special, differentiation from the original screenplay is done through the exit of the character Eric Garcia. While in the original play, Eric scares Miss. Jimenez from Honest Sancho's, the adaptation showcases Eric walking out with the secretary after the purchase is done. When one of the supporting characters comments on the absence of Eric, stating that he might not have wanted to leave with the secretary (Los Vendidos 21:14), they joke and say that he has transformed into his character, the Mexican-American. They then proceed to joke around and ask who the next person to take up the mantle of the Mexican-American. One of the supporting actors then brings out a map showcasing the different areas in America in which similar infiltrations are taking place. The special ultimately ends with a cutback to Luiz Valdez on the pyramid as he explains his view of “the universal life of the Chicano” (Los Vendidos 23:16)

== Sources ==
- Huerta, Jorge A. (1952), Chicano theater: themes and forms, Bilingual Press, p. 274, ISBN 0-916950-26-3
- Luis Valdez - Early Works: Actors, Bernabe and Pensamiento Serpentino from Arte Publico Press in Houston, Texas, 1990.

Espinosa, Kristin E., and Douglas S. Massey. “Determinants of English Proficiency among Mexican Migrants to the United States.” The International Migration Review, vol. 31, no. 1, 1997, pp. 28–50. JSTOR, https://doi.org/10.2307/2547256. Accessed 30 Mar. 2023.

Valdez, Luis, et al. Los Vendidos . Accessed 26 Apr. 2023.
