= Jorge Huerta =

Chicano scholar, author, and theatre director

Jorge Alfonso Huerta
- Born: November 20, 1942 (age 83)
- Education: California State University, Los Angeles (B.A.) University of California, Santa Barbara (Ph.D.)
- Occupations: Scholar, Writer, Professor, Director

Jorge Alfonso Huerta (born November 20, 1942, in Southern California) is a Chicano scholar, author, and theater director. He specializes in Chicano and United States Latinx Theatre. He has written and edited several books specializing in Chicano theatre and is considered to be an authoritative expert in his field.

== Early life and education ==
Jorge Huerta was born and raised in the greater Los Angeles area. He attended Benjamin Franklin High School in Los Angeles and graduated in 1960, going on to earn his bachelor's degree from California State University, Los Angeles in 1965. He received his Ph.D. in Theater from the University of California, Santa Barbara in 1974 and is the first Chicano man to have done so in the United States.

== Career ==
In 1975, Huerta became a professor in the Theater and Dance department at UC San Diego where he taught for more than 30 years. While there, Huerta also served as Associate Chancellor and Chief Diversity Officer from 2004 to 2007. He is currently an adjunct professor of Theater at Occidental College in Los Angeles, California, and Chancellor's Associates Professor of Theatre Emeritus at the University of California, San Diego.

Along with his wife and six other undergraduate students at UC Santa Barbara, Huerta founded El Teatro de la Esperanza in 1971. This traveling Latino theater company toured the United States, Mexico, Central America, and Western Europe. El Teatro de la Esperanza toured and put on performances until the 1990s. According to ex-artistic director Rodrigo Duarte Clark, it was intended to be "revolutionary" and was inspired by El Teatro Campesino touring company founded by Luis Valdez. El Teatro de la Esperanza started in Santa Barbara but moved to San Francisco's Mission District shortly after its founding, where it operated for over 20 years. Jorge Huerta also co-founded Teatro Máscara Mágica, a San Diego–based theater, with William Virchis in 1989. The mission of Máscara Mágica is to promote multicultural theater going experiences, to provide professional experience and opportunity to underrepresented communities, and to make theater more affordable for low-income families.

== Books and publications ==
Huerta has published two books. Chicano Theatre: Themes and Forms, published in 1982, is known to be the first publication and major study about Chicano theater in the United States. The other, Chicano Drama: Performance, Society, and Myth, published by Cambridge University Press in 2000, continued and updated his research on Chicano theater. These two books have received wide acclaim and are frequently used as source books in the field of Chicano studies. He has served as an editor for several major publications, including A Bibliography of Chicano and Mexican Dance, Drama, and Music (1978), Nuevos Pasos: Chicano and Puerto Rican Drama (1989), and Necessary Theatre: Six Plays about the Chicano Experience (1989). Necessary Theatre is an anthology of successfully staged Chicano plays that share common themes of survival and struggle. The works included are The Shrunken Head of Pancho Villa, by Luis Valdez; Latina, by Jeremy Blahnik and Milcha Sanchez Scott; Soldierboy, by Judith Perez and Severo Perez; Money, by Arthur Giron; Guadalupe by El Teatro de la Esperanza; and La Victima by El Teatro de la Esperanza.

Huerta also created and hosted a video series called Necessary Theatre: Conversations with Leading Chicano and Chicana Theatre Artists in conjunction with UC San Diego-TV. In this series, which is inspired by the aforementioned and eponymous 1989 anthology, he speaks with Chicano artists about their work, legacy, and impact on the theater community. Leading playwrights, directors, and actors such as Luis Valdez and Josefina Lopez have been featured on the show.

Huerta has contributed to over 30 scholarly articles for various academic journals. He has also served on editorial boards for academic publications, including The Journal of American Drama and Theatre, GESTOS: Teoría y práctica del teatro hispánico, the Southern Illinois University Press' Theatre in the Americas, and Theatre Forum.

Books
Year	Title	Title
1982	Chicano Theatre: Themes and Forms	Author
2000	Chicano Drama: Performance, Society, and Myth	Author
1973	El Teatro de la Esperanza: An Anthology of Chicano Drama	Editor
1978	A Bibliography of Chicano and Mexican Dance, Drama, and Music	Editor
1989	Nuevos Pasos: Chicano and Puerto Rican Drama	Editor
1989	Necessary Theatre: Six Plays About the Chicano Experience	Editor

== Stage works ==
In addition to co-founding two different theater companies, Jorge Huerta has also become well known for his work as a director for the stage.

Plays that Huerta has directed include El Jardín, I am Celso by Rubén Sierra and Jorge Huerta, Deporting the Divas by Guillermo Reyes, Zoot Suit, and Man of the Flesh. He has directed in theatres across the United States, including the San Diego Repertory, Seattle's Group Theatre, The GALA Hispanic Theatre in Washington D.C., The Old Globe, La Compañía de Teatro de Albuquerque, and New York's Puerto Rican Traveling Theatre.

== Awards and recognition ==
- Huerta received the Golden Eagle award from Nosotros, an award recognizing significant contributions of Hispanic achievement in the entertainment industry.
- Huerta won the 2007 Association for Theatre in Higher Education (ATHE) Career Achievement Award for Academic Theatre to honor his contributions to the academic field of Chicano Theatre Studies.
- He was named a distinguished scholar by the American Society for Theatre Research in 2008.
- He received a Latino Spirit Award from the Latino Legislative Caucus in 2009.
- In 2008, he was honored by the California State Assembly for "Outstanding Achievement in Theatre Arts".
- Huerta was induced in o the College Fellows of the American Theatre in 1994.
- He was named National Association of Chicana and Chicano Studies Scholar in 1997.
