= Fighting for Our Lives =

1975 film

- DVD Cover
- Directed by: Glen Pearcy
- Written by: Peter Matthiessen; Glen Pearcy; Luis Valdez
- Produced by: Glen Pearcy
- Narrated by: Luis Valdez
- Cinematography: Glen Pearcy
- Edited by: Glen Pearcy
- Production company: National Farm Workers Service Center
- Release date: November 1975
- Running time: 59 minutes
- Country: United States
- Language: English

Fighting for Our Lives is a 1975 documentary film produced and directed by Glen Pearcy. The film documents the striking of California grape workers from Coachella to Fresno as they negotiate for a United Farm Workers (UFW) contract in 1973. The film also depicts their non-violent struggle against police brutality on the picket lines. It was nominated for the 1976 Academy Award for Best Documentary Feature.
