= Agueda Salazar Martinez =

American weaver (1898–2000)

Agueda Salazar Martínez (March 13, 1898 – June 6, 2000), also known as "Doña Agueda," was an American artist, noted for her Chimayó-style woven rugs and blankets.

== Early life and education ==
Agueda Salazar was born in 1898, in Chamita, Rio Arriba County, New Mexico, to Pedro and Librada Salazar. Her father was a justice of the peace. She learned to weave rag rugs as a girl, and later learned to weave traditional blankets and rugs. She and her family moved to Medanales in 1924.

Salazar Martínez could trace her ancestry to a Navajo great-grandfather, Enríquez Córdova, who was raised by the Spanish. While being proud of her Indian heritage, Salazar Martínez considered herself a mejicana, and spoke Spanish as her first language.

== Career ==
While Salazar Martínez learned how to weave as a child, she received additional training from Lorenzo Trujillo, a member of Chimayó's Trujillo family, after marrying her husband Eusebio Martínez. Salazar Martínez supported her ten children by selling woven goods as well as flowers and vegetables from her garden. She developed natural dyes from crops she grew, and began improvising on the traditional designs she had learned. "Doña Agueda" was in her late sixties when she began teaching weaving in a home education program. At 77 she won her first blue ribbon at the New Mexico State Fair; that same year, she was recognized with a Governor's Award for Excellence in the Arts, and her rugs were displayed in the state house.

In 1977, Salazar Martinez was featured in an Oscar-nominated short documentary, Agueda Martinez: Our People, Our Country, directed by Esperanza Vásquez, and produced by Moctesuma Esparza. She was the guest of honor at 1980's inaugural Feria Artesana in Albuquerque, New Mexico. She traveled to Washington, D.C., with her daughter, granddaughter, and great-granddaughter to demonstrate their craft at the Smithsonian Folklife Festival in 1986. And in 1993 she was the first Hispanic artist recognized with a Women's Caucus for Art Lifetime Achievement Award. A New York Times critic mentioned Martínez as the "acknowledged matriarch" of the weaving community in Northern New Mexico.

== Personal life ==
Agueda Salazar was married to Eusebio Martinez, whose ancestry in Chimayó dates to the seventeenth century, in 1916; the couple had ten children together. In 1992, they also had 66 grandchildren, 114 great-grandchildren, and 14 great-great-grandchildren. Altogether, her family numbered 204. She was widowed in 1962, and died in 2000, at age 102, in Medanales, New Mexico. Five of her daughters, including Eppie Archuleta, became professional weavers after her example. In 1994 she was described as the "head of the largest family of Hispanic weavers in the state" with a family numbering 64 active weavers.

Works by Agueda Salazar Martinez can be found in the Smithsonian American Art Museum and the Museum of International Folk Art. A historic marker in Rio Arriba County, New Mexico honors Agueda S. Martínez with the quote, "You Will Find Me Dancing on the Loom."
