= Sylvia Morales =

American film director (born 1943)

- Born: Phoenix, Arizona, United States
- Education: University of California, Los Angeles (BA and MFA)
- Occupations: Film director; producer; screenwriter; author; professor
- Years active: 1971–present

Sylvia Morales (born 1943 in Phoenix, Arizona) is an American film director, writer, producer, and editor. Morales is recognized as one of the first female Mexican-American filmmakers. Morales has won multiple awards for her documentaries, which portray various aspects of Hispanic American society and culture, including the farm workers struggle, Chicana feminism, and the music of Los Lobos.

While the majority of her work is in the documentary film genre, Morales has also done work for television. In addition, she has published essays and photographs on Latina and feminist issues. She has lectured and taught at universities throughout Southern California.

== Early life ==
Morales was born in Phoenix, Arizona but was raised in Southern California. Morales studied at the University of California, Los Angeles where she received her Bachelor of Arts in 1972. She then went on to receive her Master of Fine Arts in 1979 in film with an emphasis in motion picture production.

In the 1970s, the Chicana Feminist Movement was founded to address the specific needs of Chicanas as women of color in the United States. Morales was one of the first artists to write and produce works in which Chicanas were given a proper name, voice, and image. As mentioned by Jenny Dean, Chicanisma is a concept that gives a sense of sisterhood in feminist discourse. Chicanisma emerged to confront the triple oppression of race, class, and gender within the Latino community. The book, Latina Filmmakers and Writers examine the works of seven celebrated Latinas who collectively represent a 20-year history of Chicanisma and one of those listed in the book is Sylvia Morales.

Morales first became active in film and television around 1971 when she started working for Channel 7 ABC, Los Angeles in a program called Unidos which was about the Chicano community in Los Angeles. Jose Luis Ruiz who was the producer of the program was in need of a new camera operator since the person who he had hired for the job decided to quit the night before the shoot. Jose contacted Morales and gave her the opportunity to be a part of the technical crew since they had known each other at the University of California, Los Angeles (UCLA), where he had become aware of Morales' camera work. She accepted the offer and became the camera person for the program. During her time at ABC, she did thirteen half-hour documentaries. Afterwards, she began her career as a producer, director, author and editor.

== Career ==
Recommended...The film does a fine job of combining social history and biography, providing a glimpse of an important social justice movement, along with some of the significant individuals who carried it forward

For the Film A Crushing Love A Film by Sylvia Morales

— Educational Media Reviews Onliner

Morales has directed, written, produced and edited award winning and nationally recognized film and video work for the last 30 years in which she moved from the margins to mainstream media. Emerging out of the late-1960s and 1970s political milieu, Sylvia Morales along with other early Latino activist filmmakers which include Moctesuma Esparza, Jesus Salvador Treviño, Susan Racho, and Luis Valdez became involved with civil rights activism. Some were also among the first Latinos to be able to enter film schools and receive formal training. According to Origins of Chicano and Latino Cinema, activists were fighting for a more positive representation of Latinos in mass media.

Morales first emerged with Chicana (1979), a film that traces the history of the Mexican indigenous woman from pre-Columbian time to the present. This film established Morales as one of the first Chicana filmmakers in the nation. This film highlighted and celebrated the Mexican-American culture and identity. Other films that Morales has done are Love and Long Distance (1985), Hearts on Fire (1987), SIDA Is AIDS (1989), Real Men and Other Miracles (1999) and her latest production A Crushing Love (2009). Her most important work according to Osa Hidaldo de la Riva would be in broadcasting television since the media allows Morales to reach a much larger audience.

In television, Morales has worked for Showtime, PBS and Turner Broadcasting. When she worked for Showtime, she directed episodes from the three seasons of Showtime's series Resurrection Blvd, which allowed her to work with actors Elizabeth Peña, Louis Gossett Jr., Michael De Lorenzo and Esai Morales. She also worked on the Showtime series Women: Stories of Passion. She worked on erotic fiction for Showtime's Women: Stories of Passion: La Limpia (The Cleansing, 1996) (in which she worked with María Conchita Alonso) and Angel From the Sky (1997). Sylvia Morales also worked for PBS, in which she was the Latino Consortium at KCET in Los Angeles from 1981 to 1985. She was in charge of the production, programming and distribution of the programs that aired on PBS. During her time at PBS, Morales hosted the Latino Consortium's weekly national series, Presente. Along with that, Morales was one of the writing and producing teams for the award-winning series Chicano! The Mexican Civil Rights Movement for PBS, in which She produced Struggle in the Fields (1996), a 60-minute documentary that was part of the four-hour series. She also wrote and produced the half-hour documentary Tell me again...What is Love? (1998) which talks about teen-dating violence. Sylvia Morales also worked at Turner Broadcasting in the series A Century of Women, which focused on 20th century U.S. women. Her piece was Work and Family (1994), a two -hour documentary in the six-hour series. A Century of Women was nominated for ACE and an Emmy.

Besides making films and videos, Morales has published several written works, including "Chicano Produced Celluloid Mujeres", an article for the Bilingual Review exploring the portrayal of Latino women by Chicano filmmakers (1985). Her photographs are also featured in the health book A New View of a Woman's Body (1981). Morales also wrote a book titled Sara/ Teleplay in 1981. Another book that she wrote is Children With Autism : The Roles and Coping Strategies of Latino Families in 2010, which is a considered a thesis. She has directed, produced, written and has taught film and video production at California State University, Los Angeles and at the University of Southern California's School of Cinematic Arts. She is currently an associate professor in the School of Film/Television at Loyola Marymount University.

== Personal life and work ==
Morales has two children. She has spoken of her difficulties juggling her creative work and parenting, saying she feels torn between her children and her career. She admitted to feeling guilty over not spending enough time with her children. Her daughter is featured in her 2009 film A Crushing Love.

== Technique ==
Morales uses reenacted scenes with voice-overs from traditional on-camera interviews for some of her documentaries, such as Chicana. She uses Chicano docudrama to recreate historic events. Morales, like many other Chicano filmmakers take on projects with little or no funding, she often uses her own money to complete her productions. Morales has used murals to figure out the history that is not well depicted for her work. Sylvia Morales has many ways in which to approach the way in which she acquires funding for her productions. One way she mentions in her interview is by creating grant proposals or fundraising to obtain funding for the projects.

== Film screenings ==
Morales' work has been shown in film festivals, universities, and in community gatherings throughout the U.S., Mexico, South America, Spain and France. In many of her screenings she has been a guest speaker in which she allows for dialogue about the film and about her life.

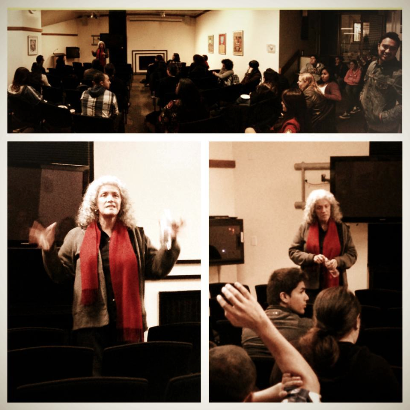
Sylvia Morales Film screening at UCSC

Locations:

-UCSC El Centro

-CineFestival en San Antonio

-Boyle Heights Latina Independent Film Extravaganza

-The California Aggie in Davis

-OC Film Fiesta in Santa Ana

-UC Berkeley's Multicultural Center

-Oberlin College Multicultural Resource Center

-Reel Rasquache Film Festival

-Echo Park Film Center

There are many more locations in which her documentaries have been shown.

== Future projects ==
Sylvia Morales' next project will be Chicana II or Mestiza which looks at the women: mestiza, chicana, exploring the feminist evolution within the mestiza that begins in the late 60's to the new millennium. She mentions in her interview with Osa Hidalgo de la Riva that the documentary might take a long time to get done since she has a variety of respsibilities as a professor and mother. She also faces other complications that may delay the production which is the lack of funding since she is mainstream and not in the industry, as well as the research has to be all done by her. She did mention in her interview that she is putting together a research proposal so she can acquire the funds to hire people to help her complete her project.

== Works ==
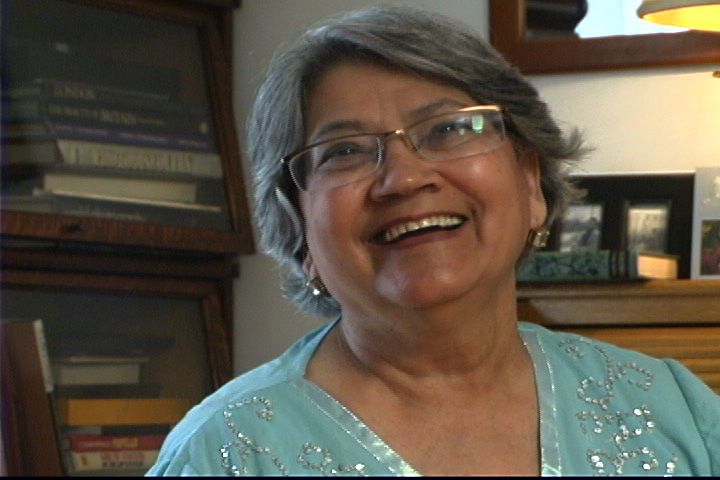
Still from "A Crushing Love: Chicanas, Motherhood and Activism" (2009)

Sylvia Morales, along with Jean Victor released the documentary Faith Even to The Fire in 1993. This landmark documentary is the first to demonstrate contemporary U.S. nuns living out a mission of social justice, even when it brings them into conflict with the Catholic church. It follows the stories of three nuns: Rosa Martha Zarate, Judy Vaughan and Marie de Pores Taylor. The sisters speak out about racism, sexism and classism within the church. The sisters also mention in the film what they've done and still do to combat it. Since theses -isms affect the people they serve. In the words of Maxwell Anderson's Joan of Arc, they keep their faith " ... even to the fire."

Morales's documentary Chicana was released in 1979. The film depicts back to pre-Columbian to present times, where it illustrates the women's role starting with the Aztec society till present day where she shows that Chicanas have become an active part in Mexico and the United States. Linda Gross from Los Angeles Times, describes Chicana as "A well-researched and spirited documentary made with much love."

Sylvia Morales' sequel A Crushing Love: Chicanas, Motherhood and Activism was released in 2009. Her film honors the work of five activist Latinas, Dolores Huerta, Elizabeth Martínez, Cherríe Moraga, Alicia Escalante, and Martha P. Cotera. All the female activist portrayed in the film explore their struggles as mothers, Chicanas, and Activist. According to Prof. of Television, Film & Media Studies at CSU Los Angeles, John Ramirez states:“Morales comes full circle to an unprecedented chronicle of the rich history of US Latina women’s leadership, strength and struggle in the workplace, the family, community, society, the world.”

== Filmography ==
Year	Film	Genre	director	Producer	screenWriter	Actor	Other	Notes
1973	The Serpents of the Pirate Moon	Drama				Yes		
1979	Chicana	Historic	Yes					
1982	Seguin	Historical					Yes	Script Supervisor
1985	Love, Long Distance	Comedy		Yes				
1986	Interview with Ricardo Montalban	Interview		Yes				
1987	Hearts on Fire	Drama			Yes		Yes	Screen Writer
1989	SIDA Is AIDS		Yes	Yes				
1991	Esperanza	Drama	Yes	Yes				
1993	Faith Even to the Fire	Documentary		Yes	Yes		Yes	Narrator, editor
1993	U.S./Mexico border crossings; The Electronic arrow : how Indians use video	Documentary, Drama, Historical	Yes	Yes				
1994	A Century of Women: Work and Family	Documentary, Drama, Historical	Yes					
1994	A Century of Women: Image and Popular Culture	Documentary, Drama, Historical	Yes					
1994	A Century of Women: Sexuality and Social Justice	Documentary, Drama, Historical	Yes					
1995	The Bronze Screen: 100 Years of the Latino Image in Hollywood (film)	Documentary					Yes	Interviewee
1996	Chicano! History of the Mexican-American Civil Rights Movement	Documentary, History					Yes	Segment producer
1999	Real Men and Other Miracles	Drama			Yes		Yes	Screen Writer
2001–2002	Resurrection Blvd.	Drama	Yes					6 Episodes
2009	A Crushing Love: Chicanas, Motherhood and Activism	Documentary	Yes				Yes	Narrator

== Awards and nominations ==
Sylvia Morales has been the recipient of the prestigious Rockefeller Fellowship Award in media.(WMM) Sylvia has also been participant in the American Film Institute's Directing Workshop for Women. She has been honored as a Fellow from the National Endowment of the Arts. Morales has also been awarded with the VESTA Award which honors outstanding contributions of Southern California women to the arts. She has also been honored with a Salute to Latinas Award for distinguished work in her field from the city of Los Angeles. She has also been honored by Comision Femenil Mexicana Nacional's 20th Anniversary celebration for Latinas in Film and Television. Last but not least Sylvia was awarded with USC Latina/o Cinema Society Woman Filmmaker award.

In 2021, "Chicana" was selected for preservation in the United States National Film Registry by the Library of Congress as being "culturally, historically, or aesthetically significant".

== See also ==
- Chicana
- Resurrection Blvd.
- Women: Stories of Passion
- The Bronze Screen: 100 Years of the Latino Image in Hollywood (film)
- LMU
- USC
- UCLA
- Dolores Huerta
- Elizabeth Martínez
- Cherríe Moraga
- Martha P. Cotera
- Rosa-Linda Fregoso
- Bilingual Review
