= I Am Joaquin =

Poem associated with the Chicano movement

I Am Joaquin (also known as Yo soy Joaquin), by Rodolfo "Corky" Gonzales and translated by Juanita Dominguez, is a famous epic poem associated with the Chicano movement of the 1960s in the United States. In I am Joaquin, Joaquin (the narrative voice of the poem) speaks of the struggles that the Chicano people have faced in trying to achieve economic justice and equal rights in the U.S., as well as to find an identity of being part of a hybrid mestizo society. He promises that his culture will survive if all Chicano people stand proud and demand acceptance.

The Chicano movement inspired much new poetry. I Am Joaquin is one of the earliest and most widely read works associated with the movement. In its entirety, the poem describes the then modern dilemma of Chicanos in the 1960s trying to assimilate with American culture while trying to keep some semblance of their culture intact for future generations, then proceeds to outline 2000 years of Mexican and Mexican-American history, highlighting the different, often opposing strains that make up the Chicano heritage. In the poem, for example, the speaker, Joaquin, traces both his ancestry to the Spanish conquistadores and the Aztecs they conquered; he also identifies with revolutionary figures of Mexican history such as Miguel Hidalgo y Costilla, Benito Juárez, Pancho Villa and Joaquin Murrieta who was a legendary Californian known for seeking retribution against the Anglo-Americans invaders who killed his wife. The poem creates a "multivalent and heroic identity" in the figure of Joaquin, one that serves as a "collective cultural identity that contains within it a call to action."

In 1969, the poem was adapted into a short film by director Luis Valdez, a leading figure in Chicano theater.

Scholars note that I Am Joaquín played a central role in shaping early Chicano nationalist identity by linking personal struggle to a collective historical narrative. The poem’s epic structure, which moves through pre‑Columbian, colonial, and modern eras, has been described as a deliberate attempt to reclaim cultural continuity for Mexican Americans. Historians also argue that the poem influenced the formation of Chicano student groups such as MEChA, who adopted its themes of unity and resistance during the late 1960s.

Literary critics have also emphasized the poem’s role in shaping Chicano aesthetics by blending political activism with experimental poetic form. Juliana Spahr argues that Gonzales’s rapid shifts in voice, historical allusion, and montage‑like structure reflect broader trends in 1960s U.S. ethnic literature toward reclaiming narrative authority and resisting assimilationist pressures. Scholars further note that the poem’s emphasis on masculine heroism and revolutionary lineage later became a point of debate among Chicana feminists, who critiqued early Chicano nationalist texts for marginalizing women’s experiences and political contributions. These discussions positioned I Am Joaquín not only as a foundational cultural text but also as a catalyst for internal dialogue within the Chicano movement about gender, representation, and the future direction of Chicano identity.
