= Chicano/Latino Film Forum =

Chicano/Latino Film Forum was an association of Latino filmmakers, students, academics, and audience members that was active in the Austin, Texas area from 1993 to 1999.

The original co-founders of the Chicano/Latino Film Forum were A.J. "Alex" Avila , Cristina Ibarra , and Rene Renteria . The original purpose of the organization was to promote Latino filmmaking and to bring filmmakers and audiences together on a regular basis to view media projects largely unavailable to an audience hungry for such programming.

Seldom were films programmed for audience screening without the presence of at least one of the principal filmmakers. Over the course of the life of the project, the Chicano/Latino Film Forum presented the works of such film personalities as Carlos Avila, Jesse Borrego, Hector Galan, Nancy de los Santos, Efraín Gutiérrez, and many others.

In 1996, co-founder Cristina Ibarra left the group and named Sandra Guardado as her replacement as a co-director with Avila and Renteria.

The Chicano/Latino Film Forum was active at a time when Austin was emerging as a viable independent, regional film scene thanks to the success of such Austin-based filmmakers as Richard Linklater ("Slacker" and "Dazed and Confused") and Robert Rodriguez ("El Mariachi"). Other Austin-based film organizations that emerged at the time include the Austin Film Society, Reel Women, Austin Filmworks, and the Austin Cinemaker Co-Op. From its inception, the directors reached out to other filmmaking communities and Latino festivals. The Chicano/Latino Film Forum provided judges for the first ever South By Southwest Film Festival. And group members helped to program some aspects of other Latino film festivals such as CineFestival in San Antonio , CineSol in the South Texas Valley , and Cine Las Americas in Austin.

By 1999, the emergence of viable web video, and the growth of Cine Las Americas, a locally based Latin American Film Festival, (mostly Latin American imports) made the need for the Chicano/Latino Film Festival less imperative and the volunteer directors quietly dissolved the group.
