= Martha P. Cotera =

Mexican-American librarian, writer, and activist

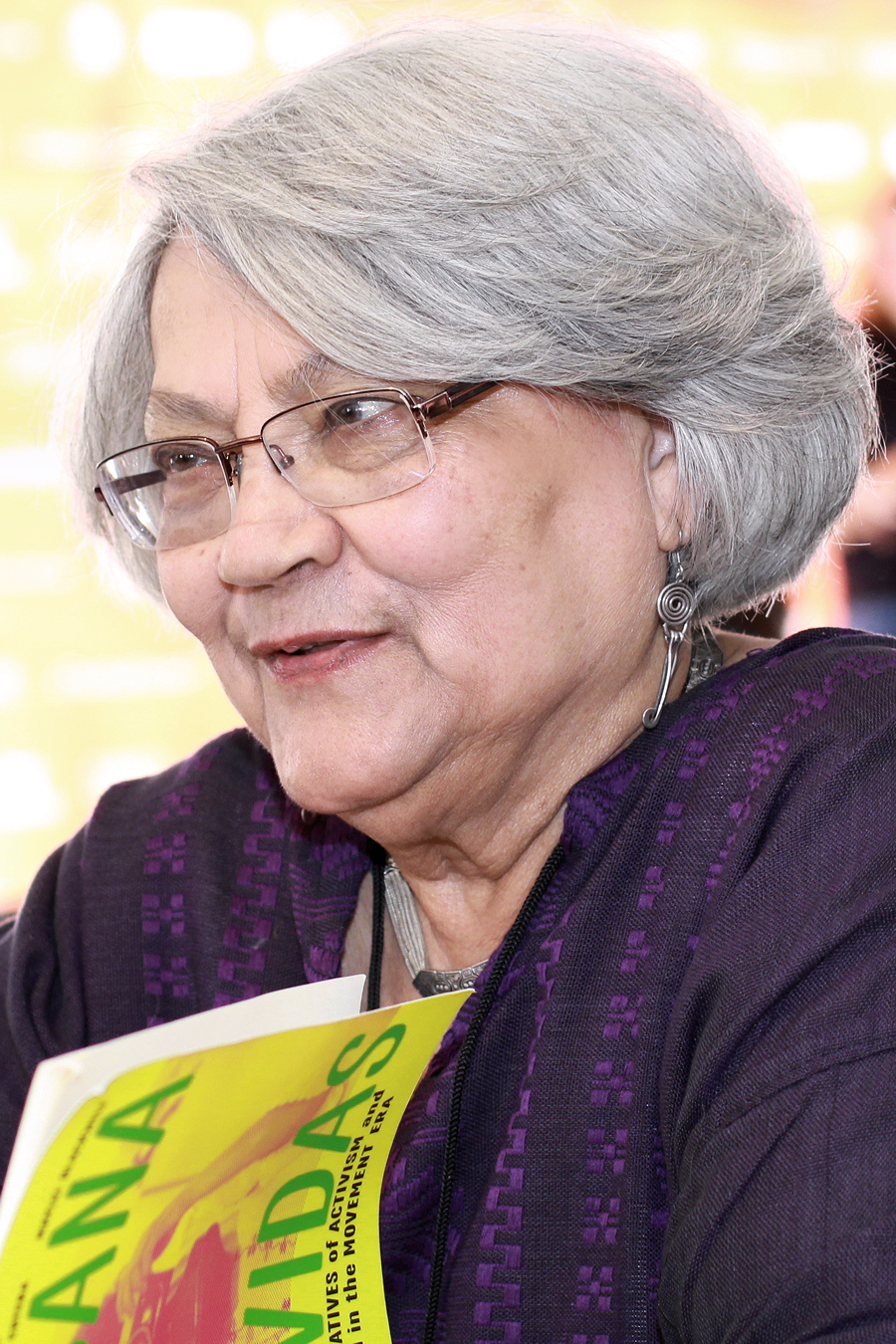
Cotera at the 2018 Texas Book Festival

Martha P. Cotera (born January 17, 1938) is a librarian, writer, and influential activist of both the Chicano Civil Rights Movement and the Chicana Feminist movement of the 1960s and 1970s. Her two most notable works are Diosa y Hembra: The History and Heritage of Chicanas in the U.S. and The Chicana Feminist. Cotera was one of six women featured in a documentary, Las Mujeres de la Caucus Chicana, which recounts the experiences of some of the Chicana participants of the 1977 National Women's Conference in Houston, Texas.

== Early life ==
Daughter of Juan Piña and Altagracia Castaños, Cotera was born in Chihuahua, Mexico. and was one of four children. She and her mother immigrated to El Paso, Texas in 1946 and she was educated in the El Paso Public Schools. She married Juan Cotera in 1963 and had two children.

== Education ==
Cotera began her elementary education in Mexico. Her grandfather taught her to read when she was very young and when she immigrated from Mexico to the United States she was moved ahead from first grade to third grade in the Texas public schools. In 1962 Cotera earned a bachelor of arts degree in English with a minor in history from Texas Western College, which is now the University of Texas at El Paso. Later, in 1971, she earned a master's degree in education from a satellite campus of Antioch College, which is based in Yellow Springs, Ohio.

== Career and political involvement ==
Cotera began her prolific career as a librarian in El Paso in her late twenties. In 1964, the Texas State Library in Austin hired her as the director of documents and information and in 1968 she became the director of Southwest Educational Development. She has been involved with several established political and activist organizations. She first became involved with PASSO (Political Association of Spanish Speaking Organizations) and in 1964 in the following years she and her husband also began working with the farmworkers movement.
In 1964 she and other Texas educators formed TEAMS (Texans for Educational Advancement for Mexican Americans), a network of educators that mobilized support for the students who participated in the high school walkouts organized by the Mexican American Youth Organization. When the walkouts occurred in Crystal City, Texas in 1968, Cotera and her family moved there to work as tutors for the striking students.
Cotera and her husband moved to Mercedes, Texas, in 1970. There they helped found Jacinto Trevino College with the Antioch College Graduate School of Education. Eventually this school became the Juarez-Lincoln University. Though it no longer exists, it was developed as a college for Mexican Americans to prepare teachers for bilingual education programs. Martha and her husband Juan served on the faculty until 1975.

Cotera and her husband were both very involved with the Raza Unida Party, a third political party which was founded in Crystal City, Texas. In 1972 she ran for a seat on the State Board of Education in the Winter Garden Area under this party. She and other women active in the party felt marginalized by the male leaders of the movement, so they established Mujeres de La Raza Unida (Women of the Raza Unida) in order to open up more political opportunities for women and bring their issues of interest onto the party's agenda. While living in Crystal City, Cotera headed the Crystal City Memorial Library and her husband was the urban renewal director of the town. The Texas Women's Political Caucus was founded by Cotera and other women in 1973. In 1974, she founded the non-profit Chicana Research and Learning Center in Austin, Texas. This information and research center helped to find grant money for research and community projects, with an emphasis on women of color. In 1975 Cotera began working as a special staff consultant with the Benson Latin American Collection at the University of Texas. This collection holds archives of important Mexican American history and Cotera worked for over 25 years to locate and obtain the archives of important figures in Mexican American cultural politics in Texas and beyond. Her position was terminated in 2009 to the dismay of the many Mexican American community activists, artists, and writers whose papers she had located.

She is one of the subjects of Sylvia Morales' A CRUSHING LOVE, the sequel to CHICANA.

== Summaries of published works ==
=== Diosa Y Hembra ===
Diosa y Hembra: The History and Heritage of Chicanas in the U.S. was published in 1976 and as the title suggests it was a contribution to the recovery of the lost, erased and hidden histories of Chicana women with the intention to serve as a concise primer to revolutionize the educational curricula relevant to Mexican-American women. In her introduction Cotera states,

The Mexican American woman as a human being, as a topic for research, or as the object of a project or curricula is an elusive being. Myths and stereotypes abound because very few resources have been allocated to objective research and to documenting historical fact. A popular myth and often-used excuse for not producing curricula relevant to Mexican American women is that "there is no literature available." Literature and information abound, undiscovered and unculled in archives (church, University of Texas, Bexar, Santa Fe State Library Archives, etc.), obscure university publications, theses and dissertations, in the writings of women themselves, in period community newspapers, and in government publications.

In an interview with Mary Ann Villarreal, Cotera recalls that she began writing the book as a response to rampant misogyny within the Chicano nationalist and political movements. She wanted to convey that the participation of women in the struggle for civil rights is an inherent part of the culture and that a lack of knowledge about the history of Mexican and Mexican-American women was to blame for the misogynist attitudes. In the interview she says,

Diosa y Hembra was to provide the facts, with the sources; irrefutable sources to give us a way in to cultural nationalism, to give us a position in cultural nationalism as women, and to strengthen our position within the movement so that these men would not destroy the movement by running the women away.

Chicana Historical Legacy

Cotera writes at length about the pre-Columbian history of Mexicanas and emphasizes the role of women in the indigenous Aztec & Nahua cultures of Mexico. Similar to other Chicana feminist authors of that era she re-imagines the historical legacy of Malinalli Tenepal (La Malinche), reclaiming her as positive female figure. Covering the decades from 1900-1960 she provides numerous biographies and accounts of Mexicana/Chicana women, illustrating their historical presence in the struggles for independence and equality. She writes,

By understanding the past, Chicana historians hope that contemporary women will be better equipped to cope with the present and to determine their future ... Some Chicano males, already in leadership and authority positions, challenged women's participation in activities outside the home. Their claims were that "everyone knew", and history, culture and tradition established that Mexican American women could/should only be homemakers and mothers. Chicano activists who acted differently were vulnerable to charges of being "Agringadas," "Anglocized," "feminists" and worst of all "anti-traditionalists.

Mexicanas During the Pre-Columbian Period

Providing an outline of the role of women within the indigenous cultures of the Valley of Mexico regions, Cotera explains, "women shared the heavens with men" (13). Giving detailed citations of the names and positions of Nahua goddesses, she further outlines the roles of priestesses in religious practices and, citing Aztec legend, explains that both a man (Cipactonal) and a woman (Ozomoco) designed the Aztec calendar. Cotera makes further notes about women who became important historical figures and the exaltation of both pregnant women and the birth of girls within Nahua culture. Chicano nationalists placed great emphasis on Aztec/Nahua culture as part of the reclamation of their national identity. Cotera challenges the stereotypical "traditional" roles of women not only in the Chicano community of her time but also in a historical sense, illustrating that prior to colonization indigenous women enjoyed greater social equality within their culture. In her analysis of family life and education, Cotera mentions several times that neither social class nor gender did not limit participation. However, she does not romanticize historical fact, emphasizing that women and girls were held to high moral standards subject to severe punishment if they fell out of line. Concluding with a clearly feminist viewpoint in her discussion of employment and labor, Cotera states,

The Indian woman then, like the Chicana today, was exhorted about staying home, being a housewife, and in general being concerned about little else except home, church and the family. But like women today, women then also disregarded the dictates and assumed other roles besides that of housewife. Women also assumed part-time duties outside the home in addition to housework.

Here she has laid the groundwork for the argument against stereotypical beliefs that Chicanas have not played a significant historical role in the establishment and maintenance of Chicano identity. In clearly outlining the balanced social roles within the ancestral cultures, of which many Chicanos sought to claim connection, Cotera challenges the accepted history and culture of contemporary Mexican Americans.

Mexicanas During the Colonial Period

The Spanish colonization of the Mexico region began in 1519. Led by Hernán Cortés, this marked the beginning of an era in which, Cotera notes, "Women saw themselves totally defenseless in a world of humiliation, abuse, and slavery." Conquest of the Aztec/Nahua nation devastated its cultural practices, but Cotera focuses specifically on the impact that colonization had on women. Thereby dictating that the contemporary demand on Chicanas to remain submissive and dedicated to domesticity is a colonially imposed attitude. Here Cotera indicates the emergence of Mestizos, noting historically significant women of mixed Spanish and indigenous ancestry. Of particular significance in this section is her analysis of Doña Marina, commonly designated as the mother of the Mestizo race. While she does pay particular attention to Doña Marina, re-imagining her role in Mestizaje, her careful illustration that there were also other notable indigenous women who intermarried with Spaniards is distinct from other Chicana authors of her time.

Mexicanas and the War for Independence of Mexico

Making a great leap forward in history, Cotera moves on to an era of resistance. She describes Doña Maria Josefa Ortíz de Dominquez as a fearless woman in not only the struggle for independence from Spain but also resistance to the subjugation of women in the eras of colonial rule. Similar to her account of Doña Marina, Cotera shapes her argument that these were not simply isolated cases of outstanding women by providing lists of other women historically documented as active in the struggle for independence.

Revolution of 1910 and the Participation of Women

In this section Cotera uses the word feminist for the first time when describing the actions of women involved in revolutionary struggles. Detailing the necessity of women's participation in both the military and the social sectors, she indicates the sacrifices that all women made in response to the cultural shifts brought by colonization and war. Hinting at the commonalities between the revolutionary era and the civil rights era, Cotera notes that women of the revolution were working for "the obliteration of poverty, the equitable distribution of land, and the improvements of life for women and children in Mexico."

La Chicana and La Familia

An address to both the Anglo feminist movement and the Chicano nationalist movement, this chapter examines the role of La Chicana as the center of the family unit. She argues against both of the stereotypes that Chicanas are submissive and that machismo is natural characteristic of the Chicano male.

La Chicana Today, Posture and Accomplishments

Here Cotera outlines the achievements that Chicanas have made in education, journalism, literature, politics, and labor. The final essay in this chapter focuses specifically on feminism. Throughout the book Cotera makes the case that Chicanas, through their historical experiences, have always possessed feminist qualities.

¿Qué Sera ... Siendo Chicana?

"The future of the Chicana depends on many factors which she has been able to identify and isolate. Some of these are directly concerned with changing image. Chicana feminists and historians through research writing and active participation in curriculum projects are taking a direct hand to see that this happens." The Chicana Feminist

=== The Chicana Feminist ===
Our Feminist Heritage

Gives a history of Mexican women including the 1810 War for Independence, the impact the Mexican Revolution of 1910 had for Women's rights, and radical women and publications of Mexico.

When Women Speak: Our Feminist Legacy

Previously published in El Magazín, Vol. 1, No. 9, September, 1973 this essay asserts that feminist ideology has always existed within the Chicano community. It serves as a direct response to criticisms from Chicano civil rights groups and political parties that Chicana's were being "Anglocized" in their demands for gender equality.

Chicanas and Power

Delivered at the L.B.J. Symposium on Women in Public Life in Austin, Texas, November 11, 1975 this speech was also published in the periodical Hembra in the Spring 1976 issue. The speech summarizes some of the influential Chicanas in their professions and communities as well as notable scholars. Cotera explains that supporting the white feminist movement does not increase opportunities for Chicanas and calls for Anglo feminists to consider strategies for solidarity.

Feminism As We See It

Address delivered to the Texas Women's Political Caucus, Mesquite, Texas, March 11, 1972. Details the "role of women in the Chicano Movement Politics" (17) and compares the Anglo feminist movement to the work of Chicanas within the Chicano Nationalist movement. Here again, she criticizes both racism within Anglo feminist ranks and sexism within the Chicano nationalist movement.

Roles

First published in Chicana Week, University of Texas, May, 1975 Cotera writes of the multiplicity of Chicana's roles in society over the years and states that a woman can embrace traditional roles in Chicana Feminism. She addresses the fears of the Chicano community that Chicana feminists are being Anglocized in their pursuit for what are considered "non-traditional" roles for women.

Identidad

Delivered as the keynote address for the Chicana Identity Conference at the University of Houston in November 1975. Emphasizes the importance of a strong cultural and feminist awareness, women in politics, and intermarriage and identity. Also speaks of La Malinche

La Malinche is the woman that the men have always picked on. La Malinche fue, supuestamente, la primera India que se fué con los españoles. There's some very good research that's been done on the politics of the conquest and the reasons why she went ahead with the Spaniards. Encouraged by the Octavio Paz mentality, men have used here as club for us, to keep us down. "You stupid broads! You see what you did?" What we are is what we decide we are. And what we do with our identity is also our own decision, not the decision of men, the universities, "herstories", "his-stories", or anyone else. That goes for Malinche and for us today!

Among the Feminists: Racist Classist Issues

Source: "Issues that Divide Us: Racism and Classism." Feminism and the Law Conference, Denver, Col., Oct. 1976.

== Other publications ==
- Chicanas in Politics and Public Life 1975
- Dona Doormat No Esta Aqui: An Assertiveness and Communications Skills Manual for Hispanic Women 1984
- Handbook on Educational Strategies and Resources for Sex-Cultural Relevant Classroom Practices and Materials published by the United States Department of Health, Education and Welfare, Women's Educational Equity Program, 1980
- Parent Education Training Program for the Texas Association of School Boards in 1989
- Featured in anthologies and journals such as:
  - El Caracol
  - The Women Say/The Men Say: Women's Liberation and Men's Consciousness
  - Twice a Minority: Mexican American Women
