= Selling out =

Compromising integrity for personal gain

To "sell out" is to compromise one's integrity, morality, authenticity, or principles in exchange for personal gain, such as money or power. In terms of music or art, selling out is associated with attempts to tailor material to a mainstream or commercial audience. For example, a musician who alters their material to encompass a wider audience, and in turn generates greater revenue, may be labeled by fans who pre-date the change as a "sellout". People who take well-paying jobs that involve ethically questionable activities, especially jobs that prop up the status quo, can also be accused of "selling out". "Sellout" also refers to someone who gives up, or disregards someone or something for some other thing or person.

== In sports ==
In the context of professional sports, a "sellout" is a person or group claiming to adhere to the ideology of putting the collective interests of the team, franchise or fans above their own individual accomplishments or financial gain, only to follow these claims up with actions contradicting them, such as an athlete or coach pledging to stay with a team until a specific goal is accomplished, but immediately deciding to leave the team for financial gain.

A prominent and fairly recent example is when National Basketball Association (NBA) player Kevin Durant signed a contract with the Golden State Warriors prior to the 2016–17 NBA season. Durant had previously expressed his commitment to the Oklahoma City Thunder, and at the time, the Thunder had a fierce rivalry with Golden State, having blown a 3–1 series lead in the 2016 Western Conference finals just two months before Durant signed with the Warriors. His decision resulted in fierce backlash, as many critics felt he took the "easy way out."

== In politics ==
In political movements, a "sellout" is a person or group claiming to adhere to one ideology, only to follow these claims up with actions contradicting them, such as a revolutionary group claiming to fight for a particular cause, but failing to continue this upon obtaining power.

An example of political "selling out" is a political party who has formed a coalition with another party it had historically opposed, such as the Liberal Democrats' leader Nick Clegg's coalition with the Conservative Party after the 2010 general election in the United Kingdom, during which he reneged on his pledge to oppose any increase in student tuition fees.

== In music and entertainment ==
=== Music ===
There are three distinct forms of "selling out" in terms of music. First, there is the use of the term "sell-out" to refer to those who sign for major labels or to those who license their music to companies for use in advertising that contradicts their apparent values. Secondly, the expression can refer to those who sacrifice their musical integrity through a change in their musical sound, sometimes due to pressure from major labels or in order to gain profit by making their music more appealing to a mainstream audience. The third form of selling out is simply to sell out a venue, which normally has nothing to do with a lapse of integrity.

==== Record labels and advertising ====
Since the time of big band radio shows, there has been an established relationship between musicians and commercialization. There had been some signs of resistance to this model as early as the 1960s, when gospel group The Blind Boys of Alabama refused to sign record deals to record secular music. It was not until the punk subculture in the 1970s that the notion that musicians should be completely independent of commercial influences began to increase in popularity. This partly manifested itself in the reluctance of bands to sign for major labels, as this would include taking part in activities that were seen as crass and overly commercial. This continued into the 1980s, when bands were scorned by fanzines for signing with major labels as the mainstream success this would bring was symptomatic of the general decay in culture. However, after a number of bands maintained the quality of their records after signing for a major label, by the end of the 1980s the focus on "selling out" shifted to advertising.

The attitude held by those who disliked the idea of "selling out" towards advertising was negative; comedian Bill Hicks claimed that any band who licensed their music for advertising was "off the artistic roll call forever", and Neil Young mocked the fact that songs became associated with brands on his 1988 album This Note's for You. However, although it was possible for fans to feel a sense of betrayal due to the relationship they developed with the song and artist, when artists did allow their music to be used for commercials others considered the advertised product to be more appealing. As CD sales fell and record companies became unwilling or unable to afford the push new bands needed to become established, sponsorship of bands by major companies began to be seen as more acceptable, with even minor record labels devoting time and money towards marketing deals with well-known brands.

By the 2010s, the use of licensing of artists in commercials had become an accepted part of the music industry, and even those who would previously have been considered part of the 1970s resistance to "selling out" have been used in advertising products, such as former Sex Pistols frontman John Lydon advertising Country Life butter and Iggy Pop endorsing car insurance. Consequently, it has been suggested that the acceptance of music in advertising is generational, as younger listeners are comfortable with the relationship to the point of indifference whilst those who have seen the industry evolve still reject it.

==== Musical integrity ====
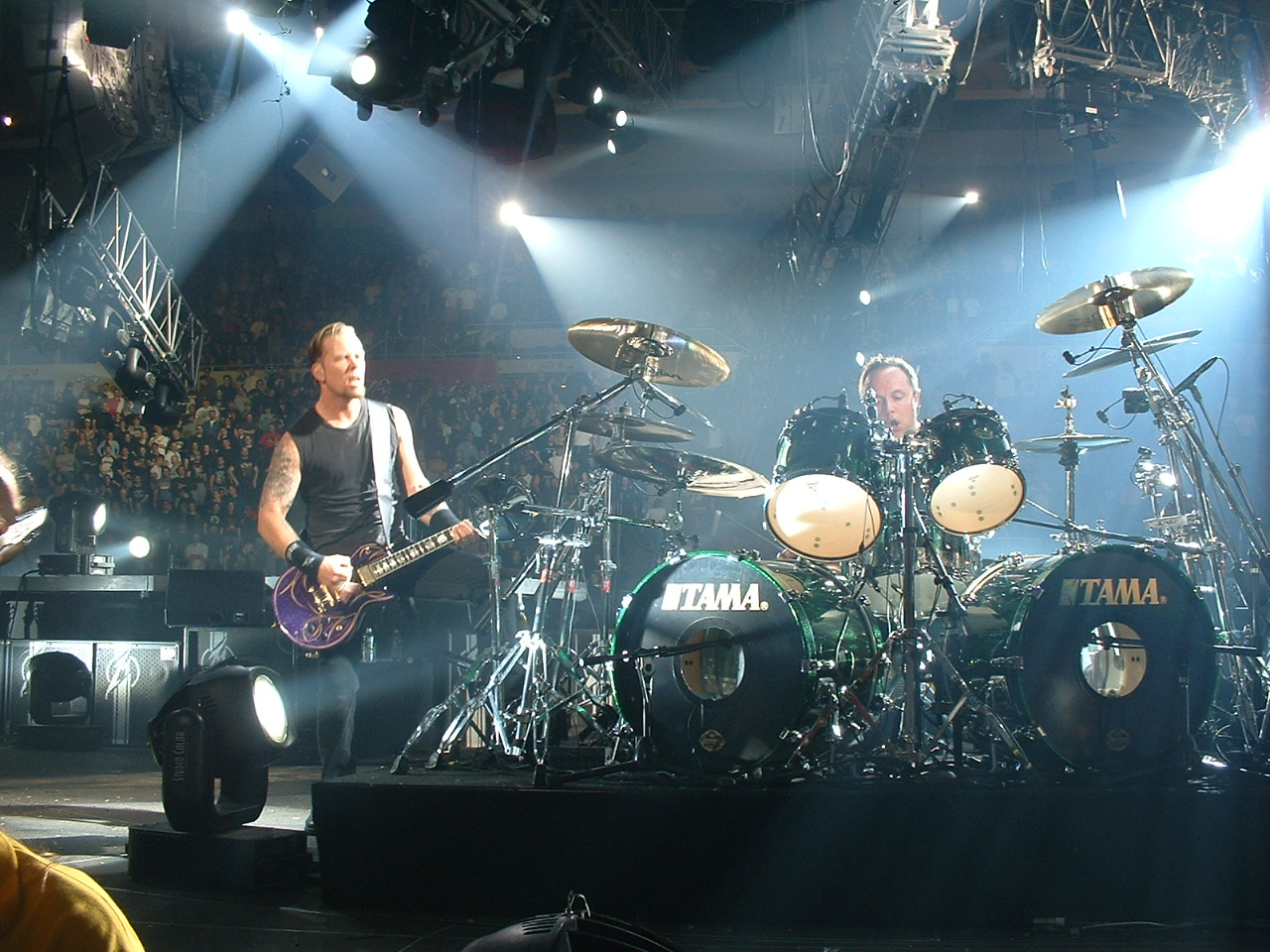
Metallica playing live in Illinois in 2004.

Another definition of "selling out" refers to putting aside musical quality or original intentions in favor of commercial success, where a distinction is made for those who achieve success without changing their original sound. The difference between the two is often subjective. While artists may change their musical direction for commercial reasons, such as pressure from major labels who require songs to appeal to mass markets, a change in sound may also be part of a natural progression of creative maturity.

An example of artists being accused of "selling out" is the band Metallica, whose 1991 eponymous album has been considered the turning point in the band's musical direction; the band members were called the "poster boys for musical un-integrity" after many incorrectly thought that the band attempted to sue fans who were downloading their music through Napster. The album, known as The Black Album, saw critics and Bob Rock, the album's producer, acknowledge that there was a move away from the band's previous thrash metal sound. Rock claimed that the change stemmed from the band's desire to "make the leap to the big, big leagues", while some fans blamed Rock himself, going as far to eventually create an internet petition demanding the band cut their ties with him. However, other fans did not consider the change in sound to be significant enough to be considered "selling out", and others accepted the change as part of a natural evolution of the band's style. Ultimately The Black Album became the band's most commercially successful release, going 16× Platinum in the United States. The differing reaction by fans to the album demonstrates the difficulty in labelling an artist as a "sellout" objectively.

"Poseur" is a pejorative term, often used in the punk, heavy metal, hip hop, and goth subcultures, to describe a person who copies the dress, speech, and/or mannerisms of a group or subculture, generally for attaining acceptability within the group or for popularity among various other groups, yet who is deemed not to share or understand the values of the subculture.

While this perceived inauthenticity is viewed with scorn and contempt by members of the subculture, the definition of the term and to whom it should be applied is subjective. While the term is most associated with the 1970s- and 1980s-era punk and hardcore subculture, English use of the term originates in the late 19th century.

=== Film and television ===
In film and television "selling out" refers to compromising the content of produced media, primarily for financial reasons; for example, introducing product placement.

Product placement, or embedded marketing, is the placement of brands or products in media in order to advertise, and has been in television from almost the very beginning, but has increased with introduction of devices such as DVRs which allow viewers, and therefore consumers, to fast-forward through adverts. It has been suggested that the idea that product placement is a form of selling out is Anglocentric, as American television shows such as American Idol and Celebrity Apprentice recorded over 500 examples of brand integration in 2011 according to Nielsen.

=== Comedy ===
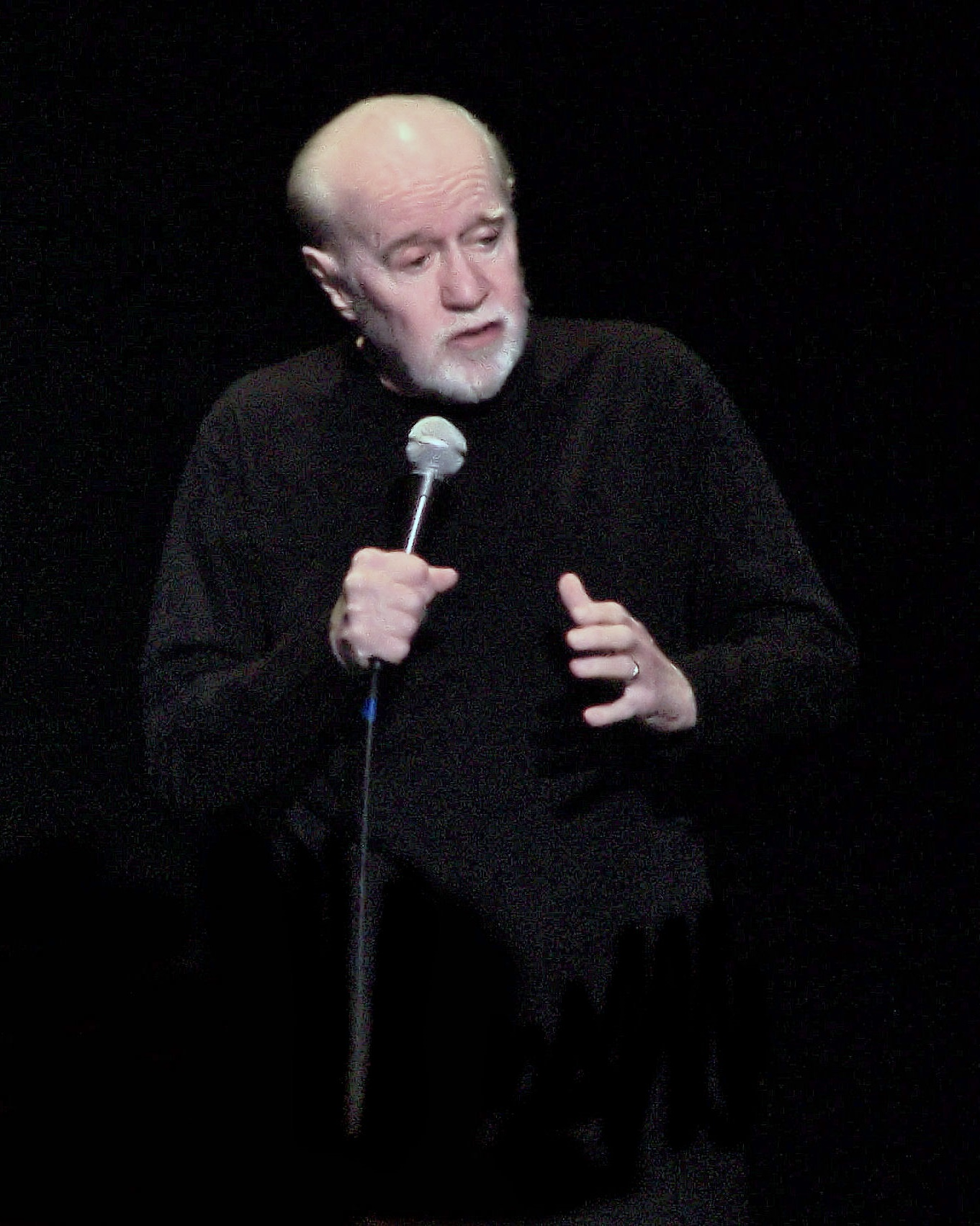
George Carlin has been accused of being a sellout for appearing in commercials for MCI, a company he had previously criticized.

Stand-up comedians occasionally face accusations of "selling out". Comedians who start out in comedy clubs might often use foul language and blue humor in their routines. A comic who alters their routine by "sugar-coating" their language and using less-offensive material to obtain mainstream success may be accused of "selling out".

George Carlin was accused of being a "sellout" for appearing in television commercials for MCI's 10-10-220. Carlin had previously spoken of his dislike for MCI's commercials in his 1996 album Back in Town. In his 1999 album You Are All Diseased, which contains rants against advertising and business, Carlin admits the dichotomy but makes no attempt to explain himself, stating, "You're just gonna have to figure that shit out on your own." In interviews, Carlin revealed he appeared in the advertisements to help pay off a large tax debt to the IRS.

Comedian/actress Janeane Garofalo has described herself as a "sellout" based on her participation with the TV show 24 playing Janis Gold. Garofalo initially turned down the role because of the way the show depicted torture scenes; however, she changed her mind later on, saying in an interview, "Being unemployed and being flattered that someone wanted to work with me outweighed my stance [on torture]." Garofalo admitted to "selling out" for losing weight in order to gain more acting work.

== In the brewing industry ==
The term has been used amongst fans of craft beer to describe when an independent brewery signs a deal with a big brewery, with the latter seen much as big record labels in the music industry. An example is when the Elysian Brewing Company signed a distribution deal with Anheuser-Busch InBev.

== Criticism of the term ==
An artist may also be accused of "selling out" after changes in artistic direction. This conclusion is often due to the perception that the reason for the artist changing artistic style or direction was simply potential material gain. This ignores other causes of artistic development, which may lead an artist in new directions from those that attracted their original fans. Artists' improvements in musical skill or change in taste may also account for the change.

Other times, artists (including those with politically oriented messages) resent the term on the grounds that the perceived desire for material gain is simply a result of the band seeking to expand its message. To such artists, not going mainstream or signing to a bigger label to avoid "selling out" prevents them from addressing a wider audience, regardless of whether or not there is any real artistic change, and arbitrarily hampers the artists' course of mainstream success. Such an accusation, then, assumes that mainstream success must be against the artists' original intentions. For example, when questioned about signing to a major label, Rage Against the Machine answered "We're not interested in preaching to just the converted. It's great to play abandoned squats run by anarchists, but it's also great to be able to reach people with a revolutionary message, people from Granada Hills to Stuttgart." Similarly, when confronted with the accusation of "selling out" in 2001, Mike Dirnt of Green Day said:

If there's a formula to selling out, I think every band in the world would be doing it. The fact that you write good songs and you sell too many of them, if everybody in the world knew how to do that they'd do it. It's not something we chose to do ... The fact was we got to a point that we were so big that tons of people were showing up at punk-rock clubs, and some clubs were even getting shut down because too many were showing up. We had to make a decision: either break up or remove ourselves from that element. And I'll be damned if I was going to flip fucking burgers. I do what I do best. Selling out is compromising your musical intention and I don't even know how to do that.

== See also ==
- Eddie Hearn
- Tyson Fury
- Saudi Vision 2030
- Acting white
- Commercialism
- Don't fuck with the formula
- Jumping the shark
- Poseur
- Recuperation (sociology)
- Uncle Tom
- Los Vendidos
- The Man
- Industry plant
