= I Am Joaquin (film) =

I Am Joaquín
- Directed by: Luis Valdez
- Based on: "I Am Joaquín" by Rodolfo "Corky" Gonzáles
- Release date: 1969
- Running time: 20 minutes
- Country: United States
- Language: English

I Am Joaquín is a 1969 short film by Luis Valdez, a project of his El Teatro Campesino.

== Summary ==
It is based on the poem "I Am Joaquín" by Rodolfo "Corky" Gonzáles, a key text of the Chicano movement.

== Reception and legacy ==
In 2010, this film was selected for preservation in the United States National Film Registry by the Library of Congress as being "culturally, historically, or aesthetically significant". I Am Joaquin was preserved by the Academy Film Archive in 2017.
