= Efraín Gutiérrez (director) =

- Born: May 1, 1946 (age 79); San Antonio, Texas, U.S.
- Occupation: Film Director
- Years active: 1976-present

Efraín Gutiérrez (born May 1, 1946) is a Chicano film director known for making films that emphasize the ethical difficulties and socioeconomic struggles that the Chicano working-class community faces. Gutiérrez is regarded as the first Mexican-American to produce a movie independently with Please Don't Bury Me Alive!, released in 1976, in which he also starred as the lead role. Gutiérrez has directed seven other movies including Amor Chicano Es Para Siempre and Run Tecato Run. Gutiérrez has also made other small work such as, A Lowrider Spring Break En San Quilmas (2001) and Barrio Tales: Tops, Kites and Marbles (2008), which both where directed and co-produced with his wife Irma Gutiérrez. Gutiérrez in 2014 had the honor to have his film, Please Don’t Bury Me Alive!, entered in the National Film Registry held by the Library of Congress. Several of his films have been archived by UCLA.

== Early life ==
Gutiérrez was born in San Antonio, Texas on May 1, 1946, to his mother, Manuela Alvizo from New Braunfels, and his father, Efrain-Abran Gutiérrez from Guanajuato. He was the youngest of 7 siblings. His family lived on the west side of San Antonio, known as one of the poorest neighborhoods. Between ages 2 and 15, Gutiérrez and his family traveled from San Antonio to the Midwest working as migrant farmworkers.

Gutiérrez was unable to attend school while his family was traveling for work, so his mother homeschooled him and his siblings, teaching them to read and write in Spanish. After many years of traveling, Gutiérrez returned to school where he would learn to read and write in English. Gutiérrez struggled throughout his school years, ultimately resulting in him dropping out twice. In 1966, at the age of twenty, Gutiérrez would finally graduate high school, making him the first person in his family to receive a high school diploma.

After graduation, Gutiérrez was unsure about what career path he wanted to take. He initially looked into the military but later decided to enroll at St. Phillips University. Shortly after, he was drafted into the Vietnam War, which would ultimately force his decision to attend school at St. Philips to avoid the draft. He later transferred from St. Philips and moved to Los Angeles to enroll at East Los Angeles College, where he took a theatre arts class. This sparked his interest in acting.

In 1978 while on a trip to Houston Texas, Gutiérrez went as a group with his brother and his brother's friends that would result in him spending time in jail. Gutiérrez knew that his brother and his brother's friends were drug dealers and trafficked drugs around Texas. Gutiérrez still went on this trip as a bystander since his brother was his only ride to the city. Upon reaching Houston city limits, their car was stopped by local DEA Agents and all men were arrested for drug possession and drug trafficking. When interrogated by the DEA Agents, Gutiérrez would not answer them or confess to anything, since he stated that he was innocent. The DEA Agents charged him with the crimes described and with accessory. He then spent 30 days in jail where he believed that his career as a film director would end, because once news broke out that he was in jail, his reputation would be ruined. In the days to come, TV News broadcast that he was in jail, since he was locally known for his work, Please Don't Bury Me Alive!. This shocked Gutiérrez, but from this time spent in jail he would reflect on his mistreatment and racial profiling to create the script for his film Run Tecato Run. When he finally got his court hearing, the Judge presiding freed him from his charges and filed it as a mistrial. When returning to San Antonio he was met with disdain, because many in the film industry thought he would not be able to continue as director, since he was associated with a criminal record.

== Career ==
While at ELAC, he met Carlos Alvarado, a notable Chicano acting agent who would become Gutiérrez's first agent. Alvarado got him an audition for John Wayne's last movie, "The Cowboy". Although he was called back multiple times, he ultimately did not get the role. Gutiérrez would later connect with Emilio Gonzales, who was on Sesame Street at the time, who invited him to join a Mexican-American theatre group. After briefly being a part of the group, Gutiérrez made the decision to move back to his hometown of San Antonio Texas and form his own theatre group. During this time, he developed an interest in filmmaking, and began to introduce the idea of making a film to a few of his colleagues. Gutiérrez later met Emilio Carbadillo, who would become a playwriting mentor for him.

In 2014, Gutiérrez began to work on a project that is related to his culture and own upbringing. It is titled "Al Norte", and it covers the topic of Mexican-American migrants that must move to the Midwest States so that they can get jobs and work towards providing for their families. This project is special to Gutiérrez since these kinds of stories relate back to him, because his father and family had to do the same thing during his childhood. The film is being worked on as a documentary, with Gutiérrez himself interviewing the oral history of migrant farmworkers starting from the 1940s to the 1970s. Production of this film is still being worked on and in 2017 Gutiérrez was in Houston to speak about the project in hopes of gathering more donations to produce the documentary.

== Please, Don't Bury Me Alive! ==
Please, Don't Bury Me Alive! was filmed in San Antonio and was directed by Gutiérrez. It takes place in the spring of 1972 and follows the story of a young Chicano male named Alejandro, played by Gutiérrez. Alejandro is dealing with the loss of his brother as well as trying to make ends meet for himself coming from an area riddled with poverty. Alejandro eventually finds himself falling into a life of crime and is eventually set up by an undercover police officer on a drug deal, receiving a 10-year sentence while a young white male is convicted of a similar sentence and given probation. This film aims to depict the social injustice in the judicial system that minorities face.

Despite producing the film on a minimal budget, Gutiérrez was able to screen the film. The turnout for the first screening ended up being successful and generated a gross income of $20,000 the first week, with a total of $40,000 for the first three weeks of showing. These numbers quickly gained the attention of other theaters, and the film grossed a total of over $300,000 in its first four months of showing.

In 2014, Gutiérrez announced plans to construct a Chicano arts center in San Antonio.

== The Betrayal (Play) ==
=== Plot ===
The Betrayal is a play-script written and directed by Efraín Gutiérrez (filmed March 3, 2020). This play project goes over the history of the City Council Massacre or Council House Fight, that happened in San Antonio, Texas on March 19, 1840. The story begins with the introduction of the tribes and native peoples involved with this era of Texas history. It included the Penatekas tribe (Comanche Tribe) as the focus point on the conflict. The story sets up the era of Texas it takes place by describing that the President of the Republic of Texas, Mirabeau Lamar wanted to make peace with the natives by setting up a treaty signing at the City Council of San Antonio. Meanwhile, the Penatekas were hesitant to make peace since the Texas Rangers and Mexican bounty hunters were known to kill any natives at the time due to South Texas and Mexican societies at that time. The story continues by following the conversions of tribe members and chiefs on how to deal with the offer. The tribe members are sitting in a circle and they one-by-one share their insight on how to deal with the offer given by Lamar. Meanwhile, a Penatekan mother and child are shown down by a river. Then the play narrator goes over briefly on how the Penatekans way of life was at stake here in history since much of their land was taken by Anglo-settlers, and that the bisons that they hunted and thought sacred to their culture were all either killed off or left their hunting grounds. Cutting back to the tribe members, Chief Maguara (Mukwooru) finally decides to take the offer given by Lamer and plans to ride with the tribe to San Antonio City Council House. The play narrator begins to speak again about the truth of what was to happen at the Council House Peace Treaty signing – That President Lamer was going to deploy Texas Rangers at the house meeting, to take the natives as hostages so that they could give up reported Anglo captives. The Penatekans sought to gain a peace treaty fairly with Lamar since they heard that Comanches successfully made treaties with him before. The play continues as the whole Penatekan tribe arrives in San Antonio and they stay around the Council House. Chief Maguara and a couple of other men of the tribe enter the house and are greeted by Texas Rangers that order them to give up all weapons so that the meeting can start. After that, Texas Ranger Colonel Karnes tells Chief Maguara that he speaks for President Lamar and says that if the treaty is to be made, he must give up all White captives to the Rangers right away. There is a native language translator present, and he gives the translation to Chief Maguara. Maguara nods his head and tells his man to get the captive. The one captive that they have is a white woman. Once the Texas Rangers receive the woman captive, they see that she was injured and then asked her if there were more captives held by the tribe. The women said that there were more captives, but Maguara answered that she was the only one. Colonel Karnes began to yell at Maguara, and then both men at this point were yelling and angry. Finally, from the film's perspective Chief Maguara lunges at the Colonel, then the Texas Rangers shot and killed all tribespeople, including unarmed women and children. The film then ends by narrating the historical event while showing pictures and paintings that referenced this event.

Influences and Notes: Gutiérrez was influenced to work on this script because he believed that Native American stories like this one were not often made into films or represented in modern society. Gutiérrez, while interviewed, credited and thanked the American GI Forum, as they helped him produce and screen this art at film festivals and library screenings around the United States. He also went on to thank the San Antonio Native American community for coming together to help him write the script for the film and play as characters for the story. He stated that he learned a lot about this story from them, and that by letting him participate in some Native American ceremonies, he felt connected more toward the film and the people. Gutiérrez hoped that by showing this film around the United States that it will encourage more film makers to write and produce more films about Native American history related to their local history. He also played a small role in this film as Pentekan Tribes man. Following this film many college professors started to request Gutiérrez, to speak at their schools for personal insight to learn about film making and covering Native American stories.
