= Chicana (film) =

1979 short documentary film

Chicana is a 1979 short documentary film by director Sylvia Morales overviewing the history of the Chicana figure from the pre-Columbian era to the Chicano Movement. The film has a run time of 22 minutes.

The film is often discussed among other Chicano films as a Chicana perspective on film. In 2021, the film was selected for preservation in the United States National Film Registry by the Library of Congress as being "culturally, historically, or aesthetically significant."

== Background ==
Sylvia Morales made the film while she was a student at UCLA. The film has been referred to the first documentary done through a Chicana feminist lens.

== Reception ==
A review for the Los Angeles Times referred to it as "well-researched and [a] spirited documentary made with much love."

== Credits ==
- Anna Nieto-Gómez - Research
- Cynthia Honesto - Research
- Carmen Moreno - Music
- Carmen Zapata - Narration
- Dolores Huerta - Interview
- Alicia Escalante - Interview
- Francisca Flores - Interview

== Preservation ==
Chicana was preserved and restored by the UCLA Film & Television Archive from a 16mm reversal print and 16mm magnetic track. Restoration funding was provided by the National Film Preservation Foundation and the UCLA Film & Television Archive. The restoration had its Los Angeles premiere at the 2024 UCLA Festival of Preservation.
