= Medanales, New Mexico =

Medanales
- Unincorporated community
- Location within the state of New Mexico Medanales (the United States)
- Coordinates: 36°10′35″N 106°10′40″W
- Country: United States
- State: New Mexico
- County: Rio Arriba

Area
  - Total: 3.16 sq mi (8.19 km^{2})
  - Land: 3.16 sq mi (8.19 km^{2})
  - Water: 0 sq mi (0.00 km^{2})
- Elevation: 5,840 ft (1,780 m)

Population (2020)
  - Total: 224
  - Density: 70.8/sq mi (27.35/km^{2})
- Time zone: UTC-7 (Mountain (MST))
  - Summer (DST): UTC-6 (MDT)
- ZIP codes: 87548
- Area code: 505
- GNIS feature ID: 2806743

Medanales is an unincorporated community located in Rio Arriba County, New Mexico, United States. As of the 2020 census, Medanales had a population of 224. The community is located on the Chama River near U.S. Route 84, 14 miles (23 km) north-northwest of Española. Medanales has a post office with ZIP code 87548, which opened on March 10, 1945.

== Demographics ==
Historical population
Census	Pop.	Note	%±
2020	224		—
U.S. Decennial Census

== Education ==
It is in Española Public Schools. The comprehensive public high school is Española Valley High School.

== Notable people ==
- Agueda Salazar Martínez (1898—2000), New Mexican Hispanic weaver, "head of the largest family of Hispanic weavers in the state".

== Bibliography ==
- Lucero, Helen R.; Baizerman, Suzanne (1999). Chimayó weaving: the transformation of a tradition (1st ed.). Albuquerque: University of New Mexico Press. ISBN 9780826319760. OCLC 955185451.
