= El Corrido =

- La Carpa de Los Rasquachis
- Directed by: Luis Valdez; Kirk Browning
- Screenplay by: Luis Valdez
- Based on: La Gran Carpas de los Rasquachis
- Produced by: Barbara Schultz
- Starring: Felix Alvarez; Lily Alvarez; Daniel Valdez; Luis Valdez; Jose Delgado; Socorro Cruz
- Production company: PBS
- Distributed by: PBS
- Release date: November 4, 1976
- Running time: 109 minutes
- Countries: United States; Mexico
- Languages: English; Spanish

El Corrido is a 1976 musical comedy made-for-TV film directed and written by Luis Valdez, and produced by El Teatro Campesino. The film was adapted from Valdez's stage musical La Gran Carpa de los Rasquachis, which was also produced with El Teatro Campesino. El Corrido was aired on PBS on November 4, 1976, as part of its Ballad of a Farmworker television series on the series Visions.

The film stars Felix Alvarez as Jesus Pelado Rasquachi, a young Mexican man who travels to the United States in search of work, suffering various unfortunate and comical events along the way.

== Plot ==
The story begins with a young man named Beto (Daniel Valdez) questioning an old man with a guitar (Luis Valdez) about going to America to seek work, as they ride in a truck for the border. The old man decides to narrate the story of Jesus Pelado Rasquachi (Felix Alvarez) in order to show the young man what America is really like. Jesus Pelado Rasquachi finds himself unable to secure employment in the fictional Mexican town of Guangoche, and desires to migrate to the United States in search of a job. Due to his inability to pay a smuggler the fee for border crossing, he comes in contact with El Diablo (Jose Delgado), a mobster who he ends up borrowing money from. Even after borrowing the money Rasquachi is unable to cross the border due to his lack of both American money with which to bribe the guards or an American sponsor. Due to his lack of legal employment, Rasquachi is forced to work low-paying and difficult jobs at the behest of the smuggler who contracts him to various ranchers on the border near Ciudad Juarez. Rasquachi continues to work around the western area of the United States, poorly paid and subjected to poor working conditions before finally ending up in an area resembling Los Angeles, where he dies an old man, having met death (Socorro Cruz). The old man finishes his story and mysteriously disappears, when Beto is accosted by a series of farm workers who demand to know the story of Jesus Pelado Rasquachi. Beto then tells the story himself, leading the crowd away as the old man wanders down the road towards America.

== Cast ==
- Felix Alvarez as Jesus Pelado Rasquachi
- Lily Alvarez as Rasquachi's Wife
- Daniel Valdez as Beto
- Luis Valdez as Old Narrator
- Jose Delgado as El Diablo and Truck Driver
- Socorro Cruz as Death and Foreman

== Production ==
El Corrido was first produced as a stage musical with El Teatro Campesino as La Gran Carpa de los Rasquachis. Valdez made many revisions to the story of El Corrido throughout the 1960s and 1970s before culminating in his most polished version of the play. Valdez was known for the musical style known as corrido, a narrative form of storytelling that heavily incorporated Mexican folk music and rhythm, which he incorporated into the musical. When adapting the play for PBS, Valdez had to shorten the musical for its PBS adaptation, El Corrido. Part of the film was taped as a stage production.

== Style ==
Luis Valdez and El Teatro Campesino were known for their use of corrido in conjunction with the Mexican carpa (Comedic shows usually arranged out of tents) to portray modern life for farm-workers and migrants. While El Corrido is a comedy like most carpa's, El Corrido was especially known for its usage of supernatural elements and very dark humor to establish morality and spiritual conflict El Teatro Campesino was also notable for their use of actual migrants in their plays, they often cast family members and nearby workers in order to maintain authenticity in their work.
