= Please, Don't Bury Me Alive! =

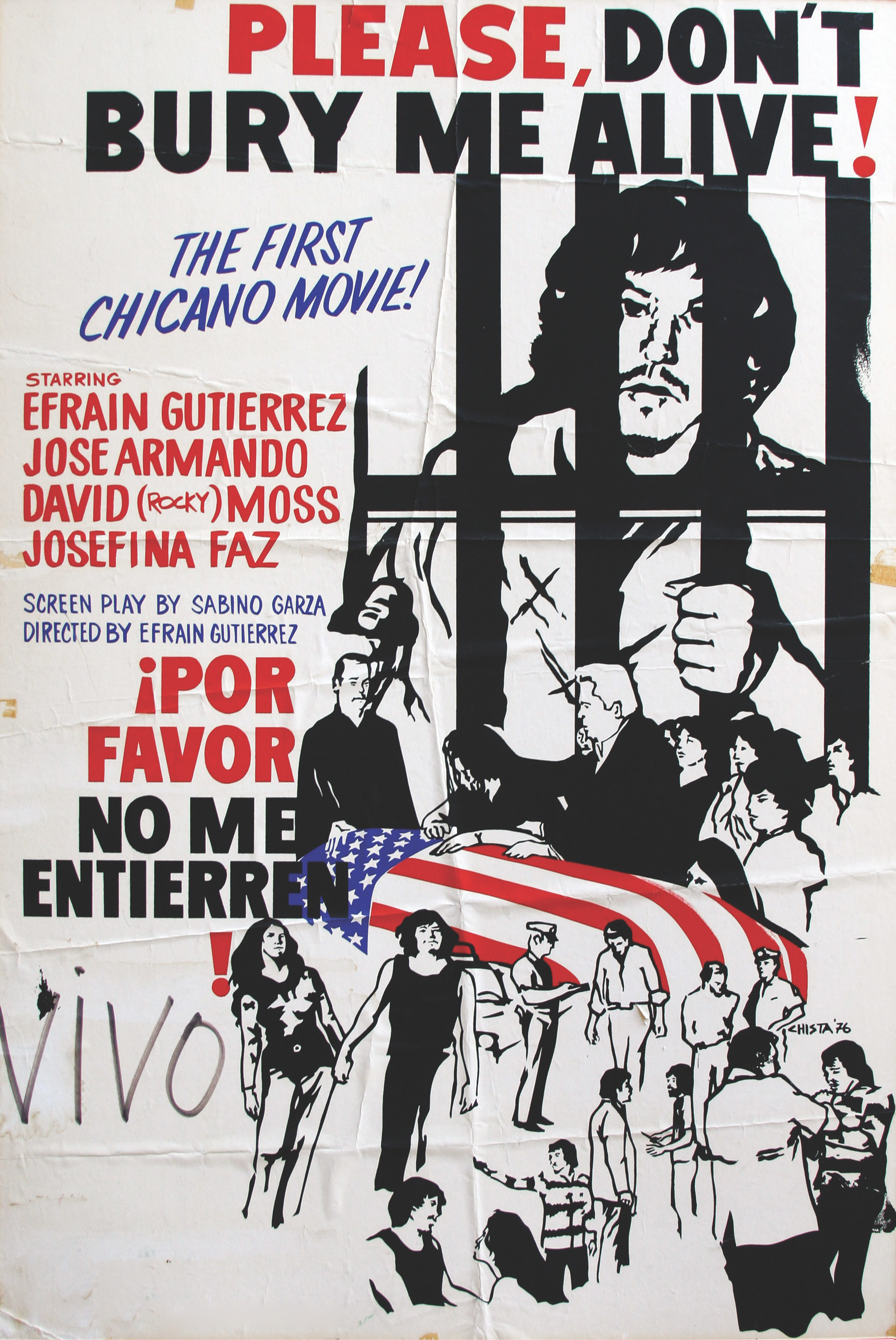
- Film poster by Jesús María "Chista" Cantú
- Directed by: Efraín Gutiérrez
- Written by: Sabino Garza
- Produced by: Josey Faz
- Starring: Efraín Gutiérrez
- Release date: 1976
- Running time: 81 minutes
- Country: United States
- Languages: English, Spanish
- Budget: $60,000
- Box office: at least $300,000

Please, Don't Bury Me Alive! is a 1976 independent film directed by and starring Efraín Gutiérrez and written by Sabino Garza. It is considered to be the first Chicano feature film. In its first four months of showing, the film made $300,000 at the local box offices where it was shown.

Please, Don't Bury Me Alive! was considered lost since 1980 following Gutiérrez's departure from the film industry. The film was "re-discovered" by University of California, Los Angeles professor Chon Noriega in 1996. Noriega, the UCLA Film & Television Archive, and the UCLA Chicano Studies Research Center then restored and re-released the film.

In 2014, the film was selected for preservation in the United States National Film Registry by the Library of Congress as being "culturally, historically, or aesthetically significant".

== Plot ==
The events take place in San Antonio, Texas in the spring of 1972, where the young protagonist Alejandro Hernandez (played by director Efraín Gutiérrez), buries an elder brother killed in the Vietnam War. The young unemployed Chicano, a petty criminal, is entrapped in a heroin deal by law enforcement officials, receiving a 10-year sentence. An Anglo youth, convicted of a similar sentence, is given probation. The judge who sentences Alejandro is revealed as the same person who presided over the funeral of the young man's brother. Chronologically, the film links the release date of the protagonist with the release of the film in 1976.

== Production ==
=== Inspiration ===
In an interview with the Academy of Motion Picture Arts and Sciences, Efraín Gutiérrez stated that the story of Please, Don't Bury Me Alive! took inspiration from real life events from his youth, in particular, he cites a trial in 1973 in which he had witnessed an old friend of his get sentenced to 10 years in prison for possession of drugs just after having witnessed trials in which white people who had similar charges were being given less harsher sentences. Sometime after the trial, Gutiérrez was encouraged by a local reporter to adapt the story into a play as a way for Gutiérrez to better express how he felt about the trial, eventually, Gutiérrez and Sabino Garza would make the decision to adapt the story into a movie.

=== Writing ===
After deciding to go forward with making the movie, Gutiérrez and Garza hired a Mexican writer recommended to them by Emilio Carballido to help them with the scriptwriting process, but eventually the writer decided to leave the project, telling them that he was unable to capture the chicano experience as well as they could and encouraged them that Garza alone would be a much better fit, and thus, Garza became the main screenwriter for the film.

=== Funding ===
In his interview, Gutiérrez states that while they had the script and actors for the film, they did not have any money to afford any of the equipment necessary for filming. Then after meeting with a man from the American Lutheran Church who was able to have the church offer Gutiérrez a loan of $10,000 for a camera on the condition that they can see a scene from the film. With help from students from Trinity University, Gutiérrez was able to film a scene which the church liked and they eventually decided to turn his loan into a grant.

=== Filming ===
Filming for Please, Don't Bury Me Alive! took approximately 2 years, from 1974 to 1976. According to Gutiérrez, the script had not yet been complete by the time they began filming and they were continuing to write scenes as they filmed. He also states that when filming they would avoid making frequent camera movements because they were concerned that it "probably would have made things worse", so instead of frequent camera movements, they went with simply trying to keep the camera in one place "like a theatre".

== Budget ==
Filmed over a two-year period, the production cost $60,000, and grossed $300,000 in Spanish language theaters in the Southwestern United States.

== Reception ==
Please, Don't Bury Me Alive was first screened at Trinity University with many people, including critics, having been in attendance. According to Gutiérrez, there was one critic in particular who heavily disliked the film and "put a bad letter to the editor", resulting in the movie being discussed by some public outlets in a negative manner.

According to Chon Noriega, Gutiérrez did not appear to believe that Please, Don't Bury Me Alive! would be much of a success as he attributed the opening night sales to "friends and family in attendance" and that shortly afterwards he "retreated to his home ... [with] instructions that he was not to be disturbed until Monday, when he would check the box office receipts". It would not be until the next day when Gutíerrez was asked to return to the theater that he saw how popular the film had become, having grossed $20,000 it its first week and eventually grossing over $300,000 after a four month run in more movie theaters across Texas.

In an interview with The Chicano Times newspaper, Gutiérrez was emphasizing that Please, Don't Bury Me Alive! was a lot more than just a small project, in his interview he states that "it may seem [like this movie] was the work of a few people. [But] in reality it turned out to be the production of a lot of raza... it was the people from the barrios that lent us a lot of support both morally and physically". In the article, it's also mentioned that much of the Mexican American community connected to this movie, specifically referencing an elderly lady who expressed her gratitude to Gutiérrez for his work on the film and hoped that he would continue developing more films in the future.

== Cultural significance and scholarly interpretations ==
There have been many discussions concerning Please, Don't Bury Me Alive! and its cultural impact.

In her article Josey Faz: Traces of Tejana in Chicano/a Film History, Mirasol Enríquez states that Please, Don't Bury Me Alive!, along with Gutiérrez's other films all seem to share the same idea of "[exploring] the harsh realities of institutional racism, poverty, and drug culture that affected the Chicano communities they represented" and that the fact that the films were independent projects is "representative of the resourcefulness and community-oriented nature of the first wave of Chicano filmmaking practice".

In his article Rescued from Amnesia: Political Afterlives of the 1980s Chicano Wave, Michael Zendejas, discusses how "The marginalization of the Chicano community gives... films a radical alterity which can ultimately lead to a systemic critique, especially when historicized". He attempts to prove this point by stating that Please, Don't Bury Me Alive!, aims to address "a corrupt legal system and socioeconomic marginalization".

In his article The Migrant Intellectual, Chon A. Noriega compares the director and star of the film, Efraín Gutiérrez to Oscar Micheaux, claiming that they both "produced low-budget, yet popular films for a local, minority audience" but that with Gutiérrez films, "one can easily see the influence of the telenovela in his work".

Noriega also lists three specific ways that the film depicts its themes.

1. Shift in language and setting: He states that the film's shift from mostly Spanish dialogue to mostly English dialogue mirrors the shift from the main character's situations from being in his home to being in state institutions.
2. Hypocrisy: Noriega explains the main characters hypocrisy with how the main character attempts to express concern towards his community but is still shown to engage in racist and sexist behavior.
3. Generational Conflict: Noriega explains that there are scenes where the main character is attempting to challenge his parents beliefs and views. The main character is seen challenging his mother's "belief in fate and evangelical radio" and his father's belief in "Protestant work ethic" and "delayed gratification"

== Preservation ==
During the theatrical run of Please, Don't Bury Me Alive!, Gutiérrez was approached by a Mexican film company with a deal to produce another film with him as well as help him with distributing Please, Don't Bury Me Alive! to more theaters. According to Gutiérrez, after signing the contract, they took his prints of the movie and "they never showed it anywhere, they didn't do anything with it... and [Gutiérrez] couldn't have them because they took [his] prints, they took everything away from [him]."

According to Chon Noriega, Gutiérrez's films had been presumed to be lost or destroyed since 1980, following the director's mysterious disappearance around the same time. Noriega then states that eventually around late 1996, following a search for Gutiérrez, Gutiérrez had reached out to Noriega and together, they began to try to preserve Please, Don't Bury Me Alive! along with the film's promotional content as well. In an interview, Gutiérrez would go on to say that "if it hadn't been for Chon Noriega from UCLA, I would have lost the prints because he was the one who was able to salvage Please, Don't Bury Me Alive!".

Preserved from a 16mm print as part of the Chicano Cinema Recovery Project.
