= Agueda Martinez: Our People, Our Country =

1977 film

- Directed by: Esperanza Vasquez
- Produced by: Moctesuma Esparza
- Production company: Moctesuma Esparza Productions
- Distributed by: Educational Media Corporation
- Release date: 1977
- Running time: 16 minutes
- Country: United States
- Language: English

Agueda Martinez: Our People, Our Country is a 1977 American short documentary film about weaver Agueda Salazar Martinez, produced by Moctesuma Esparza. It was nominated for an Academy Award for Best Documentary Short.
