= Luis Valdez =

American writer and director

Luis Miguel Valdez
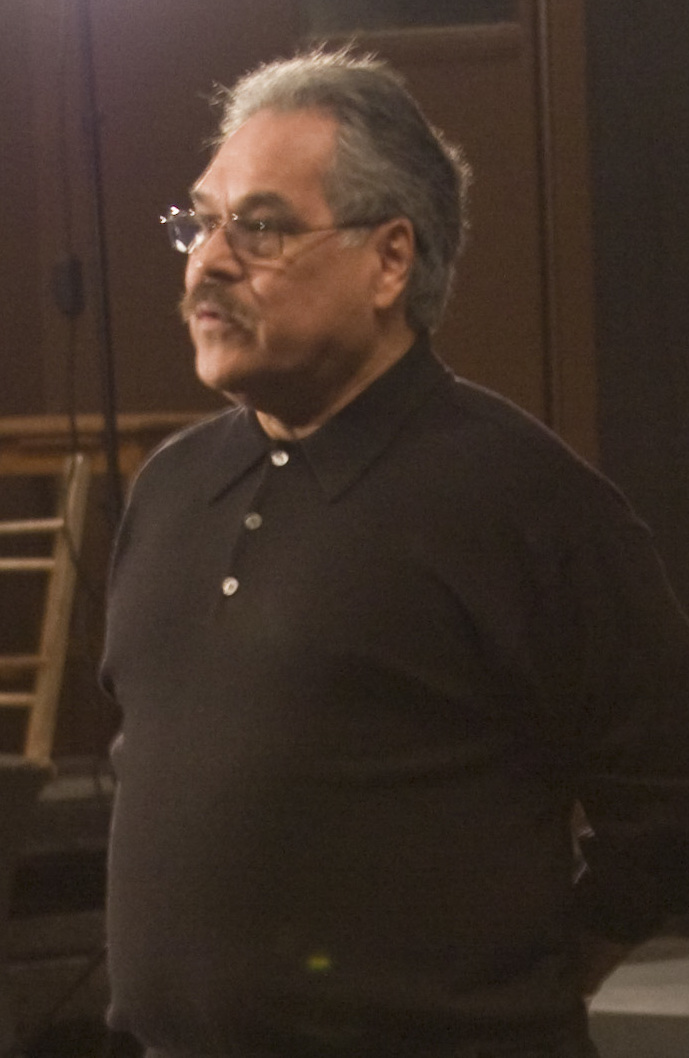
- Valdez in 2008
- Born: June 26, 1940 (age 86); Delano, California, U.S.
- Education: San Jose State University
- Occupations: Playwright; screenwriter; film director; actor
- Relatives: Daniel Valdez (brother); Lalo Guerrero (second cousin)
- Writing career
- Notable awards: Peabody Award, Aguila Azteca Award, Golden Globe nominations

Luis Miguel Valdez (born June 26, 1940) is an American playwright, screenwriter, film director and actor. Regarded as the father of Chicano film and playwriting, Valdez is best known for his play Zoot Suit, his movie La Bamba, and his creation of El Teatro Campesino. A pioneer in the Chicano Movement, Valdez broadened the scope of theatre and arts of the Chicano community.

== Biography ==
=== Early life ===
Valdez was born in Delano, California, to migrant farm worker parents from Mexico, Armeda and Francisco Valdez. The second of 10 children in his family, Valdez began to work the fields at the age of 6. One of his brothers is actor Daniel Valdez. Throughout his childhood, the family moved from harvest to harvest around the central valleys of California. Due to this peripatetic existence, he attended many different schools before the family finally settled in San Jose, California.

=== Education ===
Valdez began school in Stratford, California. His interest in theatre began in the first grade. Throughout grammar school, Valdez organized plays at school and put on puppet shows in his garage, which, he recalls, were usually about fairy tales. In high school, Valdez was part of the Speech and Drama department and acted in several plays. He described himself as "a very serious student." Valdez graduated from James Lick High School in San Jose and went on to attend San José State University (SJSU) on a scholarship for math and physics. During his second year of college, he switched his major to English. While in college, Valdez won a playwriting contest with his one-act play The Theft in 1961. Two years later, in 1963, Valdez's first full-length play, The Shrunken Head of Pancho Villa, was produced by the drama department and debuted at SJSU.

=== Early career: El Teatro Campesino ===
After graduation, Valdez spent the next few months with The San Francisco Mime Troupe, where he was introduced to agitprop theatre, guerrilla theatre, and Italian commedia dell'arte. These three techniques greatly influenced Valdez's development of the basic structure of Chicano theatre: the one-act presentational acto (act).

In 1965, Valdez returned to Delano, where he enlisted in Cesar Chavez's mission to organize farm workers into a comprehensive union. Valdez brought together farm workers and students to form El Teatro Campesino, a farm worker's theater troupe. El Teatro was known for touring migrant camps with their actos, one-act plays, which were usually around fifteen minutes long. The plays were used to educate and inform not only the farm workers, but also the public. Valdez believed that humor was a major asset to his plays in El Teatro Campesino as it was a tool to lift the morale of strikers. Social and political commentary were intertwined within the humor to accomplish the goals of El Teatro Campesino. Original plays of El Teatro were based on the experiences of farm workers, but by 1967 their subject matter expanded to other aspects of Chicano culture; Los Vendidos, for example, discusses various Chicano stereotypes. Although Valdez left El Teatro in 1967, his legacy lived on. Thanks in large part to Valdez and El Teatro Campesino, the 1970s saw an explosion of Chicano theater. Theater groups sprang up with surprising speed on college campuses and in communities throughout the United States. What began as a farm workers' theater in the migrant camps of Delano flooded into a national Chicano theater movement.

=== Later career ===
In 1967, Valdez established a Chicano cultural center in Del Rey, California. In 1969 he moved both theater and cultural center to Fresno, where they remained for two years. During this time, he made the short film I Am Joaquin based on the legendary poem by Rodolfo "Corky" Gonzáles (it was later inducted into the National Film Registry in 2010 and preserved by the Academy Film Archive in 2017). While in Fresno, Valdez taught at Fresno State University and created TENAZ, the national Chicano theater organization, which was composed of many with theatre groups throughout the Southwest. Valdez moved the theater a final time in 1971, to San Juan Bautista, south of San Francisco. Combined now with the cultural center, it was called El Centro Campesino Cultural, and it became a fully professional production company.

In 1973, he published his poem Pensamiento Serpentino, which drew on Mayan and Aztec philosophical concepts and argued that Indigenous ways of knowing were essential to the spiritual and material liberation of Chicana/os. The poem was later used in the highly successful Mexican American Studies Department Programs at Tucson Unified School District.

In 1989, Valdez and officials from the Hispanic Academy of Media Arts and Sciences and Nosotros formed the Latino Writers Group to improve opportunities and pay for Latino writers in Hollywood.

Luis Valdez is a founding faculty member and director (c. 1994) of the California State University, Monterey Bay Teledramatic Arts and Technology Department. He is credited with assisting in the development of a university program that prepares students in the entertainment industry: filmmaking, writing, sound, cinematography, and the like.

His recent play Valley of the Heart, debuted October 30, 2018, at the Mark Taper Forum in Los Angeles.

He resides in San Juan Bautista, CA. He was awarded the National Medal of Arts in 2015.

== Zoot Suit (play and film) ==
Valdez's first work that brought him attention to larger audiences was the play Zoot Suit which ran in 1978 at the Mark Taper Forum in Los Angeles and played for forty-six weeks to more than 40,000 people. With Zoot Suit, Valdez became the first Chicano director to have a play presented on Broadway in 1979. In 1981, it was made into a film.

In Zoot Suit, Valdez weaves a story involving the real-life events of the Sleepy Lagoon murder trial—when a group of young Mexican-Americans were wrongfully charged with murder—and the Zoot Suit riots.

In 2019, the film Zoot Suit was selected by the Library of Congress for preservation in the National Film Registry for being "culturally, historically, or aesthetically significant".

== La Bamba ==
The film that brought Valdez his "breakthrough into mainstream America" was La Bamba which debuted in 1987.

The film, about Ritchie Valens, a popular Chicano 1950s rock and roller, "was an overwhelming box office success" according to BookRags.

It was inducted into the National Film Registry in 2017.

On August 26, 2024 it was announced Valdez will serve as an executive producer and writer José Rivera is attached to write the script on an updated La Bamba. Although Valdez was opposed to the updated version initially, he noted new research into Valens' life, such as Corey Long's book Come On Baby, Just Rock, Rock, Rock! The Inspired Life and Enduring Legacy of Ritchie Valens featuring a foreword by Connie Valens, her research, the 2009 interview on Coast to Coast AM by Donna Ludwig, and research by The Big Bopper's grandchildren, has resulted in the commissioning of the updated film. C3 Entertainment, acting on behalf of the Valenses and the Big Bopper's daughter-in-law and grandchildren, officially licences both brands.

== Filmography ==
- Coco (2017), voice of Tío Berto and Don Hidalgo
- Cruz Reynoso: Sowing the Seeds of Justice (2000), narrator
- Ballad of a Soldier (2000), actor.
- The Cisco Kid (1994), writer and director. Valdez also had a small role as Presidente Benito Juárez.
- La Pastorela (1991 Great Performances), writer and director.
- Los mineros (1991), narrator.
- Fort Figueroa (1988 CBS Summer Playhouse), director.
- Corridos: Tales of Passion & Revolution (1987), writer and director.
- La Bamba (1987), writer and director.
- Zoot Suit (1981), writer and director.
- Bandido! (1981), documentary on the story of Tiburcio Vasquez (who resisted incursion of US-Americans into California in the 1840s to 1875), writer, director and narrator. Shown on PBS.
- Which Way Is Up? (1977), actor.
- El Corrido: Ballad of a Farmworker (1976 Visions television series), writer, director, and actor.
- Fighting for Our Lives (1975 documentary), writer.
- Los Vendidos (1972), writer and staging
- I Am Joaquin (1969), documentary short film

== Honors and awards (selective) ==
- Golden Globe Award nominations Zoot Suit (Best Motion Picture – Musical or Comedy) and La Bamba (Best Motion Picture – Drama
- Cartagena Film Festival, Best Picture Award, Zoot Suit, 1982, Cartagena, Colombia
- Peabody Award for excellence in television in 1987, Corridos: Tales of Passion and Revolution for PBS
- California Governor's Award, March 1990
- Hispanic Heritage Award in Literature, 1992.
- Mexico's Aguila Azteca Award, 1994
- 2007 USA (United States Artists) Rockefeller Fellow
- Los Vendidos
- No Saco Nada de la Escuela (1969)
- No Saco Nada de la Escuela Loco (1970)
- Honorary Degree from the California Institute of the Arts
- The National (U.S. Presidential) Medal of Arts (2015)

== See also ==
- List of Mexican American writers
- American Pachuco: The Legend of Luis Valdez, a 2026 documentary film about him

== Further information ==
- Valdez, Luis (June 7, 2014). "Luis Valdez". Visual History Program Collection (Interview). Interviewed by Lourdes Portillo. Academy of Motion Picture Arts and Sciences.
