= El Teatro Campesino =

American theatre company

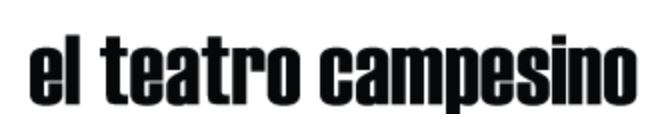
- Formation: 1965; Delano, California
- Type: Theatre group
- Location: San Juan Bautista, California
- Artistic director: Kinan Valdez
- Notable members: Luis Valdez; Diane Rodriguez
- Website: Official Site

El Teatro Campesino (Spanish for "The Farmworker's Theater") is a Chicano theatre company in California. Performing in both English and Spanish, El Teatro Campesino was founded in 1965 as the cultural arm of the United Farm Workers and the Chicano Movement with the "full support of César Chávez." Originally based in Delano, California, during the Delano Strike, the theatre is currently based in San Juan Bautista, California.

Currently, El Teatro Campesino's mission is “…to create a popular art with 21st century tools that presents a more just and accurate account of human history, while encouraging the young women and men of a new generation to take control of their own destiny through creative discipline, vibrant education, economic independence, and artistic excellence.”

== History ==
Poster for Teatro Campesino performing at a strike benefit with Quicksilver Messenger Service; July 1966 at The Fillmore, San Francisco.

Luis Valdez, along with Agustin Lira (Teatro de la Tierra), founded the troupe. After attending San Jose State University and working briefly with the San Francisco Mime Troupe, Luis Valdez met Agustin Lira, a local Chicano with theatrical experience who had already hit upon the idea of using theater as an organizing tool in the fields and was already involved in the United Farmworkers Union in Delano. The troop "was established in 1965 during the Delano grape strike."

Teatro Campesino's early performances drew on varied traditions, such as commedia dell'arte, Spanish religious dramas adapted for teaching Mission Indians, Mexican folk humor, a century-old tradition of Mexican performances in California, and Aztec and Maya sacred ritual dramas. El Teatro Campesino's roots can be traced back to Mayan ritual dramas, from records that survived Spanish conquest.

=== Use of Chicano Actos ===
Chicano actos, or skits, are short improvised scenes that were reflections of the social relationships and lived experiences of Chicanos, were used by El Teatro Campesino to connect with their audiences who were predominately other farmworkers.

El Teatro Campesino started as the cultural wing of the United Farm Workers union in California's central valley, to help raise both Mexican workers and American people awareness of the Delano grape strike controversies during the two years of the strike (1965 – 1967). Although the troupe began by entertaining the farmworkers, within a year of their founding they began to tour to raise funds for the striking farm workers. While being relocated to Del Rey, California and then Fresno, California from 1967 to 1971, their subject matter had expanded to include aspects of Chicano culture that went beyond the fields: education, the Vietnam War, indigenous roots, and racism. The work of the theater has been considered by critics of Chicano art, such as Holly Barnet-Sanchez, as a "major catalyst for an explosion of Chicano/a arts."

=== Modern era ===
Beginning in 1970, the Teatro Campesino hosted a Festival de Teatros in Fresno, California. Fifteen groups participated in the festival furthering the Chicano Teatro Movement. At the festival, members collaborated to share historical and contemporary performance materials that they could share with their home communities.

In 1971, El Teatro Nacional de Aztlan (TENAZ) was formed after groups throughout North America agreed to hold continuous conferences to collaborate with one another. In that same year, they moved their headquarters to San Juan Bautista and adapted traditional religious plays La Virgen del Tepeyac and La Pastorela for Christmas celebrations. As Chicano culture received unprecedented attention in the United States, Valdez received national attention, and taught drama at the University of California, Berkeley and University of California, Santa Cruz.

In 1973 they worked with British theater director Peter Brook; in 1976 they toured the play La Carpa through Europe, sponsored by the U.S. State Department.

== See also ==
- Mission San Juan Bautista
- Diane Rodriguez

== Notes ==
1. Organizational history, UCSB site.
2. Organizational history, UCSB site.
3. Organizational history, UCSB site.
