= Indigenous Mexican Americans =

American citizens descended from Indigenous peoples of Mexico

Regions with significant populations
- California, Texas, Arizona, Colorado, New Mexico, Southwestern United States

Languages
- American English, Spanish, Spanglish, Mixtecan languages and other Mesoamerican languages

Religion
- Christianity, Mesoamerican religion

Related ethnic groups
- Native Americans in the United States

Indigenous Mexican Americans or Mexican American Indians are American citizens who culturally identify with the Indigenous peoples of Mexico. Indigenous Mexican-Americans usually speak an Indigenous language as their first language and may not speak either Spanish or English. Indigenous Mexican-Americans may or may not identify as "Hispanic" or "Latino". While some identify as Native Mexican , others instead solely identify with their Indigenous American nation/community/culture.

== Demographics ==
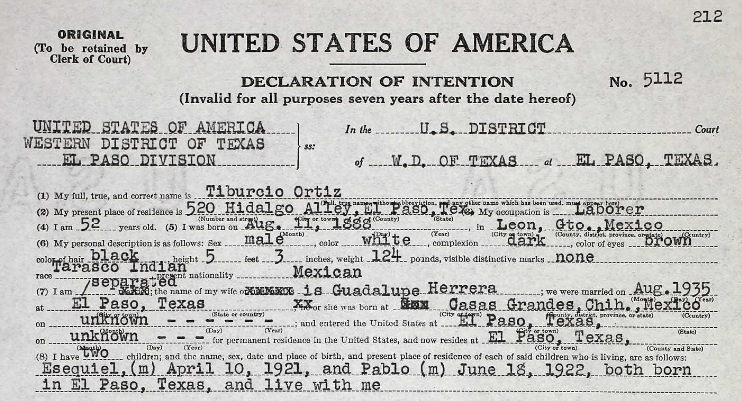
1941 Declaration of Intention for naturalization of an immigrant who is listed as "white" by color, "dark" by complexion, "Tarasco Indian" (Purépecha) by race, and "Mexican" by nationality.

California is home to a large and growing population of Indigenous American people of Mexican birth or descent. 200,000 people in the state are descended from one or more of Mexico's over 60 Indigenous groups. Many of these Indigenous Mexican-Americans hail from the Indigenous people of Oaxaca, with California being home to between 100,000 and 150,000 Indigenous Oaxacans. 50,000 are estimated to be Mixtec, an Indigenous people from the La Mixteca region of Western Oaxaca and nearby portions of Puebla and Guerrero.

== Discrimination ==
The slur "Oaxaquita" ("Little Oaxacan") is a derogatory term that is used by Spanish-speaking Mexican-Americans against Indigenous Mexican-Americans. The term carries the connotation that being from Oaxaca is negative and is often also used against any Mexican-American who is short or fat. The slur "indito" ("little Indian") is also used against Indigenous Mexican-Americans. Indigenous Mexican-Americans have been subjected to ridicule, derision, stereotyping, teasing, bullying, and other forms of discrimination and abuse by non-Indigenous Mexican-Americans. Additionally discrimination against Indigenous people can come from those who have assimilated by adopting the Spanish or English languages, despite largely Indigenous ancestry, who look down upon Indigenous people who have preserved their language and culture. Dynamics of racism and discrimination that exist within Mexico also exist within Mexican-American immigrant communities.

Discrimination against Indigenous Oaxacan and Mixtec people can also come from Mexican-Americans who, although also coming from an Indigenous Mexican background, have stopped speaking a Mixtecan or other Indigenous language. Those who have assimilated by adopting the Spanish or English languages may look down upon Indigenous people who have preserved their language and culture.

In clandestinely recorded audio leaked to the public, erstwhile president of the Los Angeles City Council Nury Martinez, a mestiza, mocked the Oaxacan community in Koreatown, saying "I see a lot of little short dark people there," whom she described as ugly. She stepped down from her position as city council president and faced wide calls to resign from the city council.

== Notable people ==
- Elisa Marina Alvarado, actress, educator
- Loretta Alvarez, Pascua Yaqui midwife
- James Anaya, lawyer
- Roy Benavidez (1935–1998), Medal of Honor recipient
- Silvester Brito (1937–2018), poet
- Abel Fernandez (1930–2016), actor
- José M. Hernández (b. 1962), astronaut, engineer
- Xiuhtezcatl Martinez (Mexica descent) (b. 2000), environmental activist, hip hop artist
- Alex Meraz (b. 1985)
- Marty Perez (b. 1946)
- Emiliano Reyes (b. 1984)
- Mariee Sioux (b. 1985)
- Xiye Bastida (Otomi) (b. 2002), environmental activist
- Xochitl Gomez (b. 2006), actress

== See also ==
- Academia Semillas del Pueblo
- Ballet Folklorico Aztlan
- Casa Dolores
- Danza Mexi'cayotl
- Genízaro
- Hayandose
- Mexican Kickapoo
- Mexicayotl
- Mixtec transnational migration
- Pelota mixteca
