= Racism in Hispanic and Latino American communities =

Racism in Hispanic and Latino American communities often manifests as anti-Black and anti-Indigenous racism. White and lighter-skinned Hispanics and Latinos may harbor racist views towards Afro-Latinos and the Indigenous peoples of the Americas. Colorism in Hispanic and Latino communities may manifest as prejudice or discrimination against darker-skinned people by lighter-skinned Hispanics and Latinos. Native-born Hispanics and Latinos may exhibit xenophobic bias against immigrants from Latin America. Some Hispanic/Latino Americans have joined far-right political movements known for racism, white supremacy, xenophobia, and antisemitism.

== About ==
According to Pew Research Center data, over one-quarter of Hispanics/Latinos in the United States report that they have experienced prejudice or discrimination for having darker skin within the Hispanic/Latino community. Among foreign-born Hispanics/Latinos, 32% have experienced discrimination from other Hispanics/Latinos and among darker-skinned Hispanics/Latinos over 40% reported discrimination from within the community.

The journalist Rachel Uranga has written that racism among Mexicans and Central American Latinos against people who are Black, Indigenous, and/or dark-skinned is "not ubiquitous" but "still runs deep in the community and is rooted in the colonial eras of Mexico and Central America."

=== Anti-Black racism ===
The legal scholar Tanya Katerí Hernández has written that anti-Black racism has a lengthy and often violent history within the Hispanic/Latino community. According to Hernández, anti-Black racism is not an individual problem but rather a "systemic problem within Latinidad" and that myths exist within the community that "mestizaje" exempts Hispanics/Latinos from racism.

The 2012 killing of Trayvon Martin by George Zimmerman, an American of Peruvian descent, sparked widespread discussions about anti-Black racism in Hispanic/Latino communities.

Many Latinos, particularly Afro-Latinos, participated in the George Floyd protests of 2020.

=== Anti-Indigenous racism ===
Hispanic/Latino racism against the Indigenous peoples of the Americas is rooted in the legacies of Spanish and Portuguese colonialism in Latin America.

==== Indigenismo ====
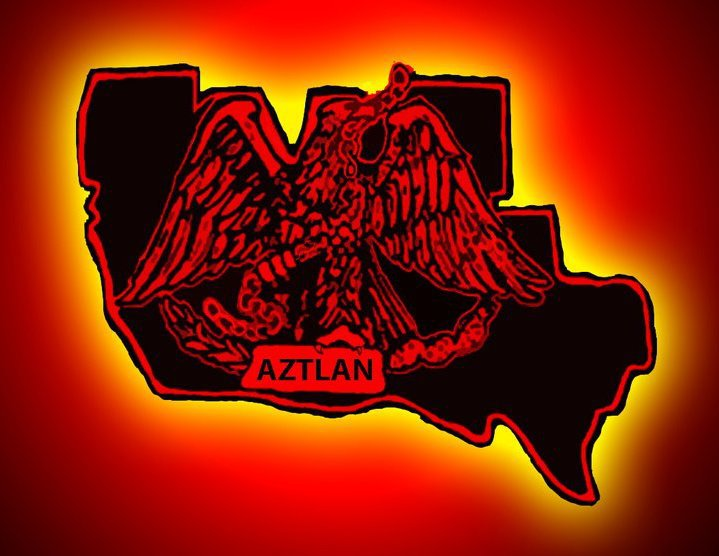
Chicanismo was based in the notion that Chicanos are Indigenous rather than immigrants or settlers by the situating of Aztlán in the southwestern US.

Indigenismo in the United States is an ideology found among some Chicanos/Mexican Americans, with roots in 20th-century state-sponsored Indigenismo policies in Mexico. Indigenismo in the Chicano movement encourages white/mestizo Chicanos to identify with Indigenous Mexican heritage, rather than with Spanish or European heritage. Chicano Indigenismo has been an important or central element of Chicanismo during the 20th century and into the 21st century. However, Indigenous people and some individuals within the Chicano movement have been criticizing Indigenismo since at least the early 1970s, rejecting the ideology's emphasis on historical heritage rather than connections to contemporary Indigenous communities, as well as Indigenismo's ties to racism, eugenics, anti-Blackness, and anti-Indigeneity in Mexican politics.

=== Far-right politics ===
Some Hispanic/Latino Americans have joined far-right movements, including white supremacist and Christian nationalist movements characterized by racism, xenophobia, and antisemitism. The journalist Paola Ramos, author of Defectors: The Rise of the Latino Far Right and What It Means for America, has written that racism and anti-communism among Hispanic/Latino Americans has led to the rise of Latino support for Trumpism. According to Ramos, Cuban Americans and Venezuelan Americans in particular join far-right racist movements in part due to "political trauma" from living under communist and socialist governments.

== See also ==
- Indigenismo
  - Indigenismo in Mexico
  - Indigenismo in the United States
- Interminority racism in the United States
- Internalized racism
- Hispanic and Latino conservatism in the United States
- Racism in South America
- Respectability politics
- White Hispanic and Latino Americans
