= Mexicayotl =

Mexican indigenous movement

Mesoamerican symbol widely used by the Mexicas as a representation of Ometeotl

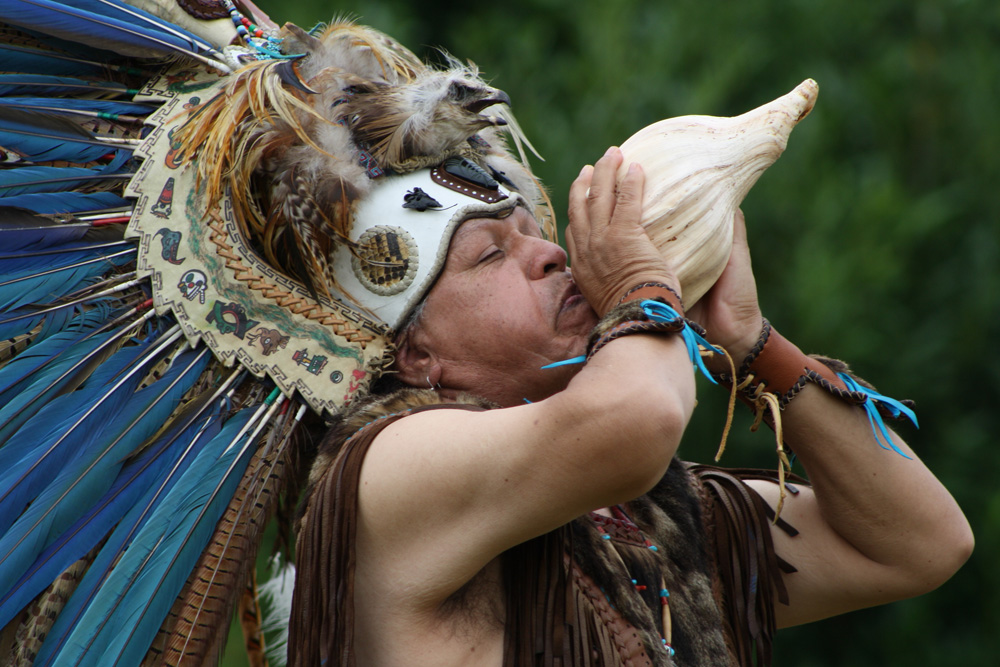
Jorge Nopaltzin Guaderrama, a modern Aztec shaman. Aztec culture had a complex priesthood, shamans, and the contemporary Aztec shamanism represents a form of neoshamanism, not an actual revival of traditional religion.

Mexicayotl (Nahuatl word meaning "Essence of the Mexican", "Mexicanity"; Spanish: Mexicanidad; see -yotl) is a movement that aims to revive the Indigenous religion, philosophy and traditions of ancient Mexico (Aztec religion and Aztec philosophy) among the Mexican people.

The movement came to light in the 1950s, led by Mexico City intellectuals otherwise known as the descendants of The Aztec Triple Alliance Elite.

== History ==
The Mexicayotl movement started in the 1950s with the founding of the group Nueva Mexicanidad by Antonio Velasco Piña. In the same years Rodolfo Nieva López founded the Movimiento Confederado Restaurador de la Cultura del Anáhuac, the co-founder of which was Francisco Jimenez Sanchez, who in later decades became a spiritual leader of the Mexicayotl movement, endowed with the honorific Tlacaelel. He had a deep influence in shaping the movement, founding the In Kaltonal ("House of the Sun", also called Native Mexican Church) in the 1970s.

From the 1970s onwards Mexicayotl has grown developing in a web of local worship and community groups (called calpulli or kalpulli) and spreading to the Mexican Americans or Chicanos in the United States. It has also developed strong ties with Mexican national identity movements and Chicano nationalism. Sanchez's Native Mexican Church (which is a confederation of calpullis) was officially recognised by the government of Mexico in 2007.

== See also ==
- Aztec religion
- Indigenismo
  - Indigenismo in Mexico
  - Indigenismo in the United States
- Mesoamerican religion
- Religion in Mexico
- Toltecayotl
