= Mexica Movement =

American/Mexican indigenous rights organization

The Mexica Movement is an "Indigenous rights educational organization" based in Los Angeles, California. Their organization views Mexicans of Native Mexican and Amerindian descent, as one people who are falsely divided by European-imposed borders. Their ultimate objective is the non-violent, democratic "liberation" of the Western Hemisphere from European-descendants. The organization seeks to create a future nation called Cemanahuac. The group views "White" people as Europeans who are squatting on Indigenous lands, and who must be repatriated back to Europe. The group rejects the "Aztlán ideology" as being too limited, seeking instead to unite the entire American continents under Indigenous control.

== Name and origin ==
The name Mexica is derived from the Nahuatl word Mēxihcah (Nahuatl pronunciation: [meːˈʃiʔkaʔ]), the name the Aztecs used for themselves.

The organization is named after the Mexica (a.k.a. Aztec) civilization. This civilization is seen as the best chance from which the continent's indigenous-descent peoples can reconstruct themselves as a nation, similar to the way that modern Italians unified their nation under Roman-Italic identity and the Tuscan dialect.

Nican Tlaca (literally meaning "Man Here") was first used in an ethnic context in the book We People Here by John Lockhart (who was the first person to create Nican Tlaca as an identity). Nican Tlaca is grammatically incorrect. Contemporary native Nahuatl speakers are dumbfounded by it since it is incomplete. In ancient text, it was used as a pronoun, not as an ethnic group as the Mexica Movement claim.

== See also ==
- Indigenismo
  - Indigenismo in Mexico
  - Indigenismo in the United States
- Manifest Destiny
