= Danza Mexi'cayotl =

Danza Mexi'cayotl is traditional Chicano dance circle of families in San Diego California. This traditional group is based on the teachings of "La Danza Conchera" (also known by the names of "Danza Azteca," "Danza Chichimeca," "Danza de Conquista,"). La Danza Conchera is a complex social/spiritual organization based on the pre-Columbian traditions of the Otomi/Chichimeca nations of Queretaro, and of the Nahuatl-speaking Tlaxcaltecan, Mexi'ca, and other Indigenous nations of central Mexico.,

Danza Mexi'cayotl was found on Dec. 12, 1980 at the hill of Tepeyacac, in Mexico City. Capitán Mario E. Aguilar Cuauhtlehcoc Quetzalcoatl, a 26-year-old Chicano was the first Chicano recognized by some of the major elders of La Danza Azteca/Conchera. Among the elders given Aguilar recognition were General Flroencio Yescas, Generala Juanita Hernandez de la Palabra del General Francisco Diaz, Capitana Rosita Maya Hernandez, Manuel and Mario Andres Pineda, Los Hermanos Placencia of Guadalajara, Miguel Avalos, Felipe Aranda, Eladio Aguillon of Queretaro, and Moises Gonzales Barrios. Tepeyacac was the pre-columbian center for the worship of "Toci Teteoinan Tonanzin" (Nahuatl for "our grandmother, the gods, their mother, our revered mother). Tonantzin was a Mexi'ca (Aztec) goddess who originally was a Culhua princess given by her father to be the wife of the Mexi'ca tribal god Huitziloppochtli

Danza Mexi'cayotl was founded by Capitán Mario E. Aguilar Cuauhtlehcoc Quetzalcoatl when he was ordered to Mexico City to be given the title of CAPITAN, or leader/elder of a traditional dance circle, by his Maestro, General Florencio Yescas. Aguilar had also learned from Andres Segura and the White Roots of peace.

In 1987, in order to continue and expand its role in teaching and preserving the Indigenous heritage of la Danza, Danza Mexi'cayotl incorporated as a California non-profit corporation, "The Mexi'cayotl Indio Cultural Center" (MICC). MICC is dedicated to teaching and preserving the Indigenous cultures of México and the southwestern United States. In 1992 MICC received recognition for the U.S. Internal Revenue Service as a community based, non-profit 501(c)(3) organization that is dedicated to bringing knowledge of the Indigenous/Mestizo living traditions of Mexico back to the Chicano/Latino communities of the U.S.

Danza Mexi'cayotl, through MICC has collected this knowledge from Indigenous and mestizo people that still live the traditional ways of life, as well as from academic, scientific, and artistic sources that have carried out rigorous research using western and non-western hermeneutics and ontologies to document, and teach living mesoamerican cultural, linguistic, and spiritual traditions.

Danza Mexi'cayotl is a collective of Chican, Mexicano, and Latinoamericano persons who are interested in creating a "third space" of an Indigenous community that gives a safe, nurturing place for people who are accepted neither within the dominant U.S. culture, nor the communities of Mexico. Chicanos, because of their skin color, language, and cultural heritage will never be seen as truly "American" by some members of white U.S. society. And because many Chicanos do not speak Spanish, and are closely identified with the Anglo-Saxon culture of the U.S., they will always remain as outsiders or "gringos" to many Mexicans.

Danza Mexi'cayotl makes this knowledge, available to students, teachers, and others who want to begin their journey into a more traditional way of life. Danza Mexi'cayotl focuses on serving multicultural youth, especially those low- income families that may not have other opportunities to gain access to traditional and living knowledge. Using traditional media such as oral, musical, and choreographic semiotics, and modern means of communication (websites, Facebook, Adobe Acrobat .PDF files and blogs), Danza Mexi'cayotl, through MICC, has extended is educational outreach to the entire globe. Capitáan Mario Aguilar, Danza Mexi'cayotl, and The Mexi'cayotl Indio Cultural Center are routinely cited in Master's thesis, doctoral dissertations and news articles.

Danza Mexi'cayotl is a circle of community residents, parents, artists, teachers, and counselors who dedicate their lives to diversity and social justice. Danza Mexi'cayotl works and prays for the cultural, spiritual, ecological, economic and political florescence of future generations on the Mother Earth.

Danza Mexi'cayotl has performed throughout the Southwestern U.S. including the world famous Gallup Inter-Tribal Indian Ceremonial.

While almost all danzantes have some Indigenous Mexican ancestry, very few of them are considered Indigenous people by the standards of the United Nations or by any national government.

== See also ==
- Indigenismo
  - Indigenismo in Mexico
  - Indigenismo in the United States
