= Ángel María Garibay K. =

Mexican philologist, historian and scholar (1892–1967)

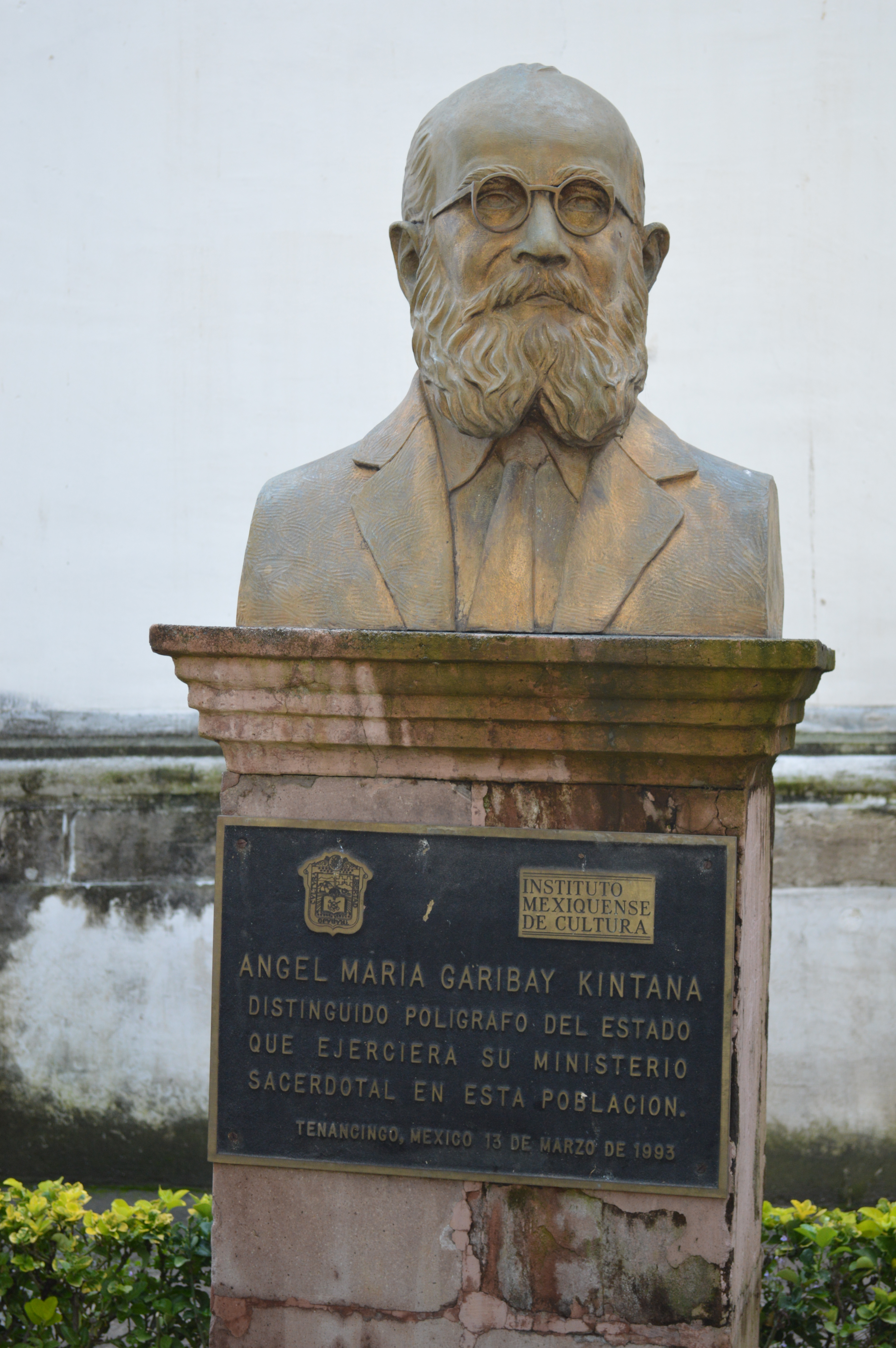
Bust of Garibay Kintana in Tenancingo, State of Mexico.

Fray Ángel María Garibay Kintana (18 June 1892 – 19 October 1967) was a Mexican Catholic priest, philologist, linguist, historian, and scholar of pre-Columbian Mesoamerican cultures, specifically of the Nahua peoples of the central Mexican highlands. He is particularly noted for his studies and translations of conquest-era primary source documents written in Classical Nahuatl, the lingua franca of Postclassic central Mexico and the then-dominant Aztec empire. Alongside his former student Miguel León-Portilla, Garibay ranks as one of the pre-eminent Mexican authorities on the Nahuatl language and its literary heritage, and as one who has made a significant contribution towards the promotion and preservation of the indigenous cultures and languages of Mexico.

Garibay and León-Portilla published texts and scholarly analysis for the study of classical Nahuatl literature, founded the journal Estudios de Cultura Náhuatl, and created the Seminario de Cultura Náhuatl. In the seminar, they taught fundamentals of literature and linguistics to Nahuas, who went on to create a modern Nahuatl literature. In recent years, the relationship between the development of Nahuatl literature as a field and the ideologies of indigenismo and mestizaje has been critically examined.

== Works ==
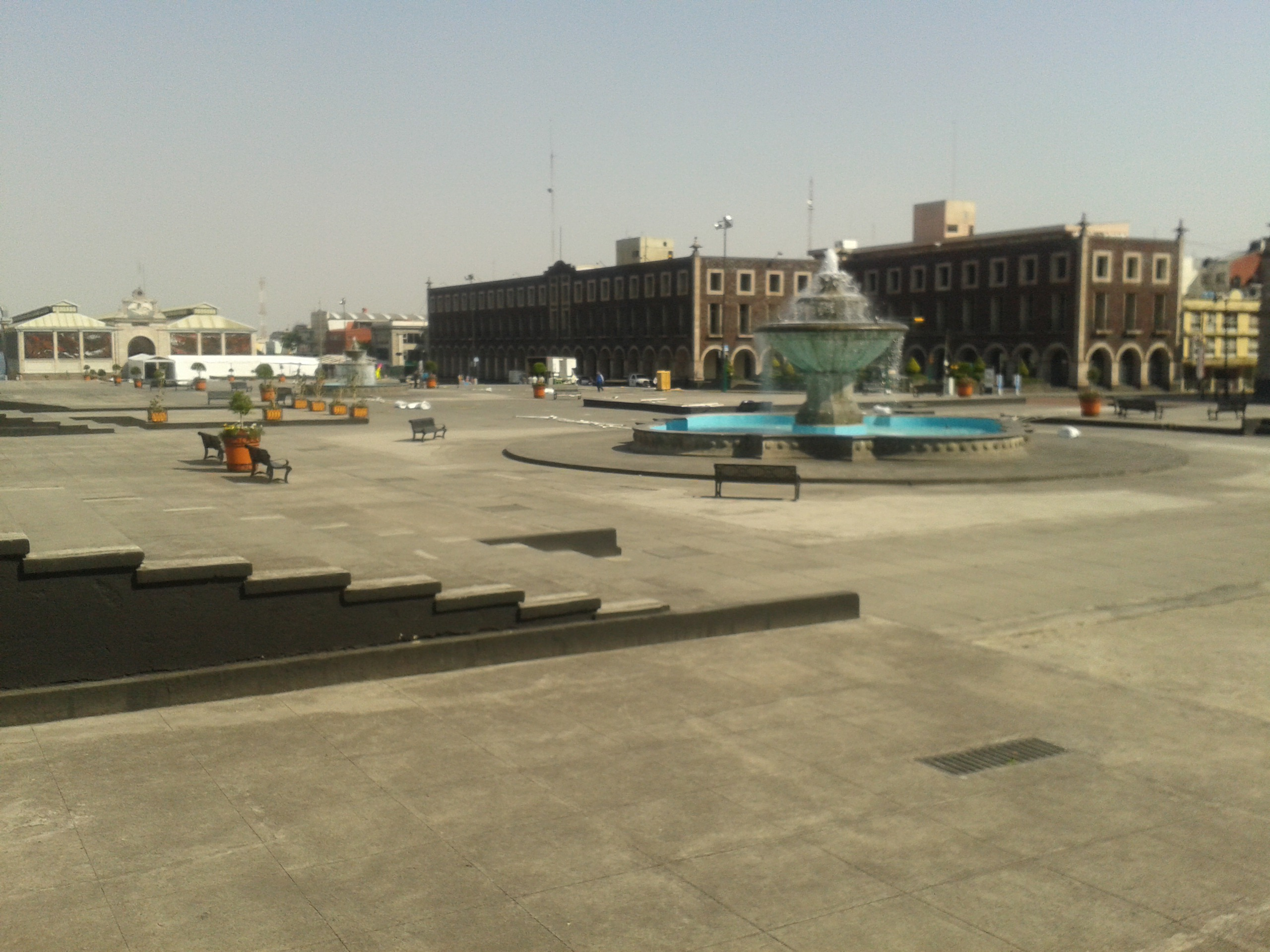
Ángel María Garibay Kintana Square in Toluca de Lerdo. 2014.

- 1937. La poesía lírica azteca. Mexico City: Bajo el signo de ábside, 1937.
- 1940. Poesía indígena de la altiplanicie. Mexico City: UNAM.
- 1958. Veinte himnos sacros de los nahuas. Los recogió de los nativos Fr. Bernardino de Sahagun, franciscano, México, UNAM, Instituto de Historia: Seminario de Cultura Náhuatl.
- 1961. Llave del náhuatl: colección de trozos clásicos, con gramática y vocabulario, para utilidad de los principiantes. Editorial Porrúa.
- 1963. Panorama literario de los pueblos nahuas. No. 22. Editorial Porrúa.
- 1964. La literatura de los aztecas. México: J. Mortiz.
- 1965. Poesía náhuatl. Universidad Nacional Autónoma de México, Instituto de Historia, Seminario de Cultura Náhuatl.
- 1967. "Códice Carolino": manuscrito anónimo del siglo XVI en forma de adiciones a la primera edición del" Vocabulario de Molina." Estudios de cultura náhuatl 7 (1967): 88.
- 1987. Historia de la literatura nahuatl: Primera parte: Étapa autónoma: de c. 1430 a 1521;[2]: Segunda parte: El Trauma de la conquista: 1521-1750. Porrúa, 1987.
- 1993. Poesía náhuatl. 3 vols. Mexico City: UNAM.
- 1997. Panorama literario de los pueblos nahuas. Mexico City: Editorial Porrúa.
