= Anahuacalmecac International University Preparatory of North America =

Charter school in Los Angeles, California, USA

Location
- Los Angeles; United States
- 34.087561°N 118.174297°W

Information
- Other names: Anawakalmekak International University Preparatory of North America (abbr. Anawakalmekak) Semillas Del Pueblo (abbr. Semillas)
- Former names: Xinaxcalmecac Academia Semillas Del Pueblo, Anahuacalmecac International University Preparatory High School of North America
- Type: Public Charter School
- Established: 2001
- School board: Irene Vasquez, Dr. Reynaldo F. Macías, Dr. Ernesto Colin, Gypsie Vasquez Ayala, Edmundo Pérez
- School district: Los Angeles Unified School District
- Grades: TK–12th
- Language: English, Spanish, Nahuatl
- Accreditation: Accrediting Commission for Schools, Western Association of Schools and Colleges (WASC) Accredited
- Website: www.anawakalmekak.org

Anahuacalmecac International University Preparatory of North America (abbr. AIUP), formerly known as Xinaxcalmecac Academia Semillas del Pueblo (English: Seeds of the People Academy) and Anahuacalmecac International University Preparatory High School of North America, is an Indigenous Mexican public charter school of the Los Angeles Unified School District (LAUSD). It offers instruction from grades Transitional Kindergarten through Twelfth, and is located in the community of El Sereno, on the east side of Los Angeles.

== History ==
The school was founded in 2002 by Marcos Aguilar and Minnie Ferguson as part of the Semillas del Pueblo educational initiative, with the goal of providing an Indigenous-centered education that incorporates Native American and Indigenous Mexican cultural traditions.

The school began operations in East Los Angeles and later expanded into a Transitional Kindergarten through grade 12 public charter school within the Los Angeles Unified School District.

In 2022, the school acquired approximately 12 acres of land in Monterey Hills that was subsequently returned to the Gabrielino Shoshone Nation, with the school serving as a steward of the property and using it as an extension of its educational programs.
