= Lourdes Gutiérrez Nájera =

Mexican-American anthropologist

Lourdes Gutiérrez Nájera

Lourdes Gutiérrez Nájera is a Mexican-American cultural anthropologist and interdisciplinary associate professor at Western Washington University in Bellingham, Washington. At Western, she has served as chair of the ethnic studies department since 2024 and is an affiliated faculty member in Latin American studies, anthropology, and the Fairhaven College of Interdisciplinary Studies. Her prior experience includes her work as an assistant professor at both Dartmouth College and Drake University. Her research is published in books such as Beyond El Barrio (New York University Press 2010) and her co-edited anthology Comparative Indigeneities of the Américas (University of Arizona Press 2012). Her academic interests include the fields of Latinx and migration studies as well as research into the indigenous communities of Mexico and the United States.

== Early life and education ==
Born in Ciudad Juárez, Mexico, Lourdes Gutiérrez Nájera moved with her family to Los Angeles, United States, as a child; she considers Ciudad Juarez and Arcadia, California, her hometowns. She received her A.A. degree from Pasadena City College and B.A. degree in Latin American studies from the University of California, Los Angeles. She later attended the University of Michigan in Ann Arbor, Michigan, from which she received an M.A. in 1995, M.S.W. in 1998, and Ph.D. in 2007. Her Ph.D. was completed jointly in anthropology and social work. Gutiérrez Nájera won a first place dissertation award at the American Association of Hispanics in Higher Education 2009 conference for her Ph.D. dissertation, Yalalag is No Longer Just Yalalag: Circulating Conflict and Contesting Community in a Zapotec Transnational Circuit.

== Career ==
From 2004 to 2005, Gutiérrez Nájera worked as a visiting instructor, and from 2005 to 2007 as an instructor, at Dartmouth College. She was also a visiting assistant professor to Yale University from 2009 to 2011. From 2007 to 2014, she served as an assistant professor in the Department of Latin American, Latino, & Caribbean Studies at Dartmouth. From 2014 to 2015, she was a visiting assistant professor of anthropology at Drake University. She was also a visiting scholar to Kansas State University in 2014. In 2015 she became an assistant professor at Drake.

In circa 2018 she joined Western Washington University. The Department of Ethnic Studies at Western launched in fall 2024, with Gutiérrez Nájera, an associate professor, as the inaugural chair. She also serves as a faculty member in the Fairhaven College of Interdisciplinary Studies and an affiliated faculty member of Latin American studies and anthropology.

== Research ==
Much of Gutiérrez Nájera's ethnographic research and work is within the frameworks of transnational migration and indigeneity. Gutiérrez Nájera's focus is on concepts of identity, conflict and belonging.

=== Hayandose ===
In her work, "Hayandose: Zapotec Migrant Expressions of Membership and Belonging," Gutierrez Najera conducted ethnographic research in the Los Angeles enclave of migrants from the Zapotec town of Yalálag, Oaxaca. Hayandose refers to the phrase "no se hayaban." The Yalaltecos use this phrase to explain a feeling of displacement, or of "belonging neither here nor there." Gutiérrez Nájera developed the concept of hayandose to explain cultural practices that create a sense of belonging, collective identity and community:

"As Yalaltecos, part of the Oaxacalifornia experience, inhabiting a space that is neither fully Yalálag or Angelinos, reflects the ambiguities they feel about belonging neither here nor there. But through participation in cultural events and practices such as those described in this chapter, Yalaltecos living in Los Angeles create a sense of belonging."

Gutiérrez Nájera contends that the Yalaltec community displays the feeling of belonging, creation of space and community for transnational migrants in which migrants symbolically exist and participate in multiple sites. Other scholars who have contributed in the area of indigenous transnational migration include [Lynn Stephen], Jonathan Fox, Gaspar Rivera-Salgado and Robert C. Smith.

=== Conflict and migration ===
Instead of viewing conflict as a finite event, Gutiérrez Nájera describes it as a process. Using a historical framework, she argues migration and the state play a role in the production of conflict among Yalaltecans. She expanded on this in her essay "Transnational Migration, Conflict, and Divergent Ideologies of Progress". In this piece, she argues conflict and migration are "interrelated parts of broad historical, economic, and political processes" that unfold through the "circulation of people, ideas, and goods". This understanding of transnational migration as part of the process of local conflict offers a new perspective for social workers working with indigenous migrants.

=== Child welfare ===
In 1996 the University of Michigan School of Social Work published her coauthored work Latinos and Child Welfare [Latinos y el bienestar del ninõ], which influenced the literature and practices of social workers working with children in the Latino community. Gutiérrez Nájera helped identify the unique social service needs and characteristics of this population and has been cited by other scholars to help address these issues.

== Selected publications ==
- Booker, Victoria K.; Robinson, June Grube; Kay, Bonnie J.; Gutierrez Najera, Lourdes; Stewart, Genevieve (August 1997). "Changes in Empowerment: Effects of Participation in a Lay Health Promotion Program". Health Education & Behavior. 24 (4): 452–464. doi:10.1177/109019819702400405. hdl:2027.42/67088.
- Gutiérrez Nájera, Lourdes (2010). "Hayandose: Zapotec Migrant Expressions of Membership and Belonging". In Pérez, Gina M.; Guridy, Frank A.; Burgos, Adrian Jr. (eds.). Beyond El Barrio: Everyday Life in Latina/o America. New York University Press. pp. 63–80. doi:10.18574/nyu/9780814768563.003.0007. ISBN 978-0-8147-9128-8.
- Castellanos, M. Bianet; Gutiérrez Nájera, Lourdes; Aldama, Arturo J., eds. (2012). Comparative Indigeneities of the Américas: Toward a Hemispheric Approach. Critical Issues in Indigenous Studies. University of Arizona Press. ISBN 978-0-8165-2101-2.
- Gutiérrez Nájera, Lourdes; Maldonado, Korinta (December 2017). "Transnational Settler Colonial Formations and Global Capital: A Consideration of Indigenous Mexican Migrants". American Quarterly. 69 (4): 809–821. doi:10.1353/aq.2017.0067.
- Gutiérrez Nájera, Lourdes; Alonso Ortiz, Ana D. (2019). "Expressing communality: Zapotec death and mourning across transnational frontier". In Saramo, Samira; Koskinen-Koivisto, Eerika; Snellman, Hanna (eds.). Transnational Death. Studia Fennica Ethnologica. Finnish Literature Society. doi:10.21435/sfe.17. ISBN 978-951-858-134-8.
