= Mexica =

Nahuatl-speaking Indigenous people of the Valley of Mexico

Mexica (plural) Mexicatl (singular)
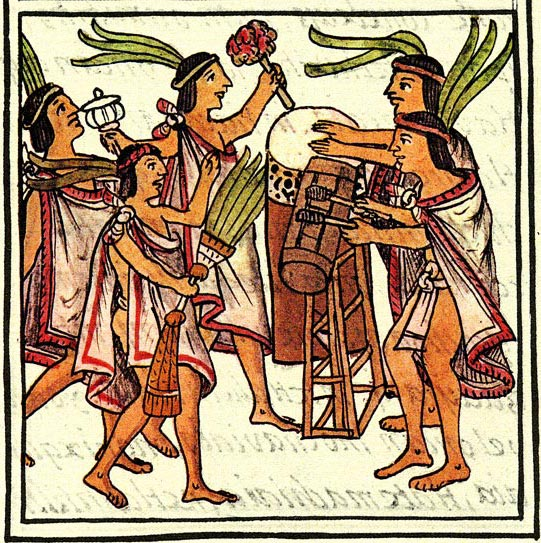
- Music and dance during a One Flower ceremony, from the Florentine Codex

Total population
- Aztec: 5–6 million people (1519)

Regions with significant populations
- Valley of Mexico

Languages
- Nahuatl, Spanish

Religion
- Catholicism blended with traditional Mexica religion

Related ethnic groups
- Other Nahua peoples

The Mexica (Nahuatl: Mēxihcah [meːˈʃiʔkaḁ]; singular Mēxihcātl) are a Nahuatl-speaking people of the Valley of Mexico who were the rulers of the Triple Alliance, more commonly known as the Aztec Empire. The Mexica established Tenochtitlan, a settlement on an island in Lake Texcoco, in 1325. A dissident group in Tenochtitlan separated and founded the settlement of Tlatelolco with its own dynastic lineage. In 1521, their empire was overthrown by an alliance of Spanish conquistadors and rival indigenous nations, most prominently the Tlaxcaltecs.

Today, descendants of the Mexica and other Aztec peoples are among the Nahua people of Mexico.

Since 1810, the broader term Aztec is often used to describe the Mexica. When a distinction is made, Mexica are one (dominant) group within the Aztecs.

== Names ==
The Mexica are eponymous of the place name Mexico (Mēxihco [meːˈʃiʔkoˀ]), originally referring to the interconnected settlements in the valley that is now Mexico City. The group was also known as the Culhua-Mexica in recognition of its kinship alliance with the neighboring Culhua, descendants of the revered Toltecs, who occupied the Toltec capital of Tula for several centuries. The Mexica of Tenochtitlan were additionally referred to as the "Tenochca", a term associated with the name of their altepetl (city-state), Tenochtitlan, and Tenochtitlan's founding leader, Tenoch. The builders of the city are references to different names "Azteca," "Mexica," or "Tenochca" in the most reliable sources, indicating that a number of different indigenous tribes settled in the area within different primary sources.

The name Aztec was coined by Alexander von Humboldt, who combined Aztlán ("place of the heron"), their mythic homeland, and tec(atl) "people of". The term "Aztec" today often refers exclusively to the Mexica people of Tenochtitlan, Mēxihcah Tenochcah, a tribal designation referring only to the Mexica of Tenochtitlan, excluding those of Tlatelolco or cōlhuah. (Note: Smith 1997, p. 4 writes, "For many the term 'Aztec' refers strictly to the inhabitants of Tenochtitlan (the Mexica people), or perhaps the inhabitants of the Valley of Mexico, the highland basin where the Mexica and certain other Aztec groups lived. I believe it makes more sense to expand the definition of "Aztec" to include the peoples of nearby highland valleys in addition to the inhabitants of the Valley of Mexico. In the final few centuries before the arrival of the Spaniards in 1519 the peoples of this wider area all spoke the Nahuatl language (the language of the Aztecs), and they all traced their origins to a mythical place called Aztlan (Aztlan is the origin of the term "Aztec," a modern label that was not used by the Aztecs themselves)") (Note: Lockhart 1992, p. 1 writes, "These people I call the Nahuas, a name they sometimes used themselves and the one that has become current today in Mexico, in preference to Aztecs. The latter term has several decisive disadvantages: it implies a quasi-national unity that did not exist, it directs attention to an ephemeral imperial agglomeration, it is attached specifically to the pre-conquest period, and by the standards of the time, its use for anyone other than the Mexica (the inhabitants of the imperial capital, Tenochtitlan) would have been improper even if it had been the Mexica's primary designation, which it was not") The term Aztec is often used very broadly to refer not only to the Mexica, but also to the Nahuatl-speaking peoples of the Valley of Mexico and neighboring regions.

== History ==
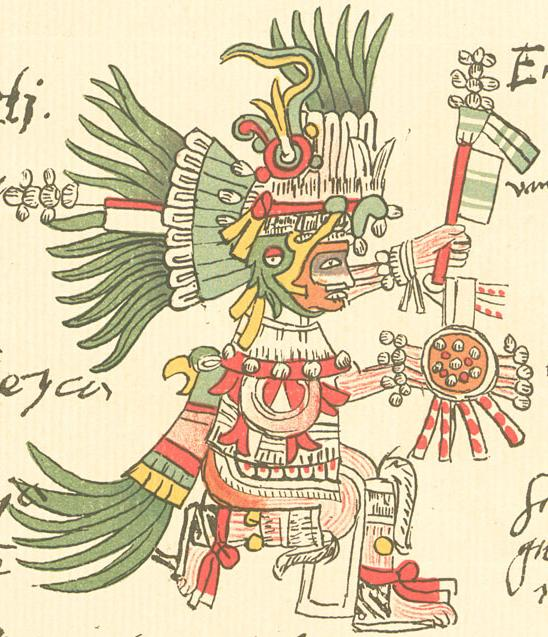
Huitzilopochtli, the patron god of the Mexica, as depicted in the Codex Telleriano-Remensis

After the decline of the Toltecs, about 1200 CE, various Nahua-speaking nomadic peoples entered the Valley of Mexico, possibly all from Aztlan, the location of which is unknown. The Mexica were the last group to arrive. There they "encountered the remnants of the Toltec empire (Hicks 2008; Weaver 1972)." According to legend, the Mexica were searching for a sign that one of their main gods, Huitzilopochtli, had given them. They were to find "an eagle with a snake in its beak, perched on a prickly pear cactus," and build their city there. Eventually, they came to Lake Texcoco, where they finally saw the eagle and cactus on an island in the lake. There, "they took refuge..., naming their settlement Tenochtitlan (Among the Stone-Prickly Pear Cactus Fruit)." Tenochtitlan was founded in 1325, but other researchers and anthropologists believe the year to be 1345. The city was described by conquistador Bernal Díaz del Castillo as a grand, well-ordered metropolis.

A dissident group of Mexica separated from the main body and built another city on an island north of Tenochtitlan in 1337. Calling their new home Tlatelolco ("Place of the Spherical Earth Mound"), the Tlatelolca were to become Tenochtitlan's persistent rivals in the Valley of Mexico. After the rise of the Aztec Triple Alliance, the Tenochca Mexica, the inhabitants of Tenochtitlan, assumed a dominant position over their two allied city-states, Texcoco and Tlacopan. The Mexica dominated the political landscape in Central Mexico from only a few years after Tenochtitlan was founded until being defeated by the Spanish and their indigenous allies, mainly enemies of the Mexica, in 1519.

Once established in Tenochtitlan, the Mexica built grand temples for different purposes. The Templo Mayor (Main Temple) and nearby buildings are rich in the symbolism of Aztec cosmology that linked rain and fertility, warfare, sacrifice, and imperialism with the sacred mission to preserve the sun and the cosmic order. The Templo Mayor was "the site of large-scale sacrifices of enemy warriors which served intertwined political and religious ends (Berdan 1982: 111–119; Carrasco 1991)." The Templo Mayor was a double pyramid-temple dedicated to Tlaloc, the ancient Central Mexican rain god, and Huitzilopochtli, the Mexica tribal nomen, who, as the politically dominant deity in Mexico, was associated with the sun. Over time, the Mexica separated Huitzilopochtli from Tezcatlipoca, another god that was more predominantly idolized, redefining their relative realms of power, reshaping the myths, and making him politically superior.

The Mexica were overthrown by the Tlaxcaltec-Spanish alliance in 1521. The area was expanded upon in the wake of the Spanish conquest of the Aztec Empire and administered from the former Aztec capital as New Spain. The city of Tenochitlan was destroyed and the treasures stolen by the victorious Spanish and Tlaxcaltec soldiers, though not nearly as much gold was found as the Spanish had hoped for. Many Mexica women were kidnapped and raped by the invaders, with the higher-ranking soldiers taking the more attractive women for themselves. Forbidden from resettling in their destroyed home, which was rebuilt as Mexico City, the Mexica were forced to submit to the King of Spain, receive baptism and convert to Christianity. Mexica rituals and worship were banned and harshly suppressed, and the images of their gods were cast down and destroyed by Spanish monks. Mexica children were forcibly taken to newly established Christian schools where they were indoctrinated into Christian beliefs and Spanish culture, and the surviving Mexica men and women were sent to work in newly-established Spanish estates, known as haciendas, as well as mines and other civil projects, such as digging canals. Some of the remaining military and nobility, including the last emperor, Cuauhtémoc, were conscripted to assist in further Spanish invasions, such as in Guatemala, to prevent any possibility of insurrection.

However, the sincerity of the Mexica conversion to Christianity was questioned by some of the Spanish missionaries, such as the monk Bernardino de Sagagún, who wrote during an epidemic in 1576 that he was doubtful of a permanent Christian presence in Mexico.

[A]s regards the Catholic Faith, [Mexico] is a sterile land and very laborious to cultivate, where the Catholic Faith has very shallow roots, and with much labor little fruit is produced, and from little cause that which is planted and cultivated withers. It seems to me the Catholic Faith can endure little time in these parts ... And now, in the time of this plague, having tested the faith of those who come to confess, very few respond properly prior to the confession; thus we can be certain that, though preached to more than fifty years, if they were now left alone, if the Spanish nation were not to intercede, I am certain that in less than fifty years there would be no trace of the preaching which has been done for them.

As a result of their defeat, subjugation, overwork and numerous waves of epidemics, the Mexica population declined dramatically, dropping perhaps as much as 90% by 1600. This number had recovered somewhat by 1821, but following Mexican Independence, Mexica and other Indigenous peoples once again found themselves marginalized by government policy, which sought to minimize Indigenous Mexican culture in favor of a blended Spanish-Mexican heritage.

Although Mexica names were largely suppressed during the colonial period as they were associated with pre-Christian beliefs, they experienced a revival in the 19th century following Mexican independence. Since then, names such as Montezuma, Cuauhtémoc, and Tenoch as first names and surnames have become more prevalent in Mexican culture and among Mexican immigrant communities abroad, such as in the United States.

In the 21st century, the Mexican government does not recognize ethnicity by ancestry but by language spoken, making the number of Mexica or Mexica descendants in Mexico difficult to estimate. In 2020, there were estimated to be over 1.6 million Nahuatl speakers living in Mexico, as well as several thousand Nahuatl-speaking immigrants from Mexico living in the United States.

In 2025, the Wereldmuseum Rotterdam claimed it is "hard to imagine" that the Mexica still exist as a distinct group, but aspects of Mexica language and culture still remain.

For the 2020 census, the United States government recognized "Aztec" as an ethnicity under the Native American race category. 387,122 people identified themselves as Aztec for the census, making Aztecs the largest non-mixed Native American group in the United States.

== Language ==
Like many of the peoples around them, the Mexica spoke Nahuatl which, with the expansion of the Aztec Empire, became the lingua franca in other areas. The form of Nahuatl used in the 16th century, when it began to be written in the Latin alphabet introduced by the Spaniards, became known as Classical Nahuatl. As of 2020, Nahuatl is spoken by over 1.6 million Mexica and other Nahua people, almost 7% of whom do not speak Spanish.

== See also ==
- Aztlán
- Indigenismo in Mexico
- Mexica Movement
- Mexicayotl

== Sources ==
- Andrews, James Richard. Introduction to classical Nahuatl. Norman: University of Oklahoma Press, 2003. ISBN 0-8061-3452-6.
- Barlow, Robert H. (1945). "Some Remarks On The Term "Aztec Empire"". The Americas. 1 (3): 345–349. doi:10.2307/978159. JSTOR 978159.
- Barlow, Robert H. (1949). Extent Of The Empire Of Culhua Mexica. University of California Press.
- Berdan, Frances F. (1998). "MESOAMERICA: MEXICA". In Werner, Michael S. (ed.). Encyclopedia of Mexico: History, Society & Culture (1 ed.). London, UK: Routledge. ISBN 9781884964312.
- Evans, Susan Toby (2008). "Postclassic Cultures of Mesoamerica". In Pearsall, Deborah M. (ed.). Encyclopedia of Archaeology (1 ed.). Oxford, UK: Elsevier Science & Technology. ISBN 9780123739629.
- Keber, Eloise Quiñones (1998). "NAHUA RULERS, PRE-HISPANIC". In Werner, Michael S. (ed.). Encyclopedia of Mexico: History, Society & Culture (1 ed.). London, UK: Routledge. ISBN 9781884964312.
- León-Portilla, Miguel (1992). Fifteen Poets of the Aztec World. Norman, Oklahoma: University of Oklahoma Press. ISBN 978-0-8061-2441-4. OCLC 243733946.
- Lockhart, James (1992). The Nahuas After the Conquest: A Social and Cultural History of the Indians of Central Mexico, Sixteenth Through Eighteenth Centuries. Stanford: Stanford University Press. ISBN 978-0-8047-1927-8.
- León-Portilla, Miguel (2000). "Aztecas, disquisiciones sobre un gentilicio". Estudios de la Cultura Nahuatl. 31: 307–313.
- Peregrine, Peter N., and Melvin. Ember, eds. 2002. Encyclopedia of Prehistory: Volume 5: Middle America. 1 online resource (XXIX, 462 pages) vols. Boston, MA: Springer US. Encyclopedia of Prehistory: Volume 5: Middle America
- Smith, Michael E. (1997). The Aztecs (first ed.). Malden, MA: Blackwell Publishing. ISBN 978-0-631-23015-1. OCLC 48579073.
- Umberger, Emily. "Tezcatlipoca and Huitzilopochtli: Political Dimensions of Aztec Deities". In Tezcatlipoca: Trickster and Supreme Deity, edited by Baquedano Elizabeth, 83–112. University Press of Colorado, 2014.
- Umberger, Emily. "Antiques, Revivals, and References to the past in Aztec Art". RES: Anthropology and Aesthetics, no. 13 (1987): 62–105.
- Willermet, Cathy, Heather J.H. Edgar, Corey Ragsdale, and B. Scott Aubry. "Biodistances Among Mexica, Maya, Toltec, and Totonac Groups of Central and Coastal Mexico / Las Distancias Biológicas Entre Los Mexicas, Mayas, Toltecas, y Totonacas de México Central y Zona Costera". Chungara: Revista De Antropología Chilena 45, no. 3 (2013): 447–59.
