= Casa Dolores =

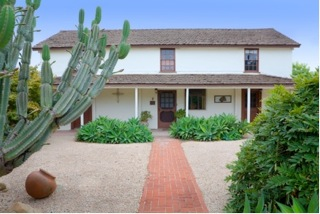
- Casa Dolores, Center for the Study of the Popular Arts of Mexico, located in the Botiller Adobe
- Location: 1023 Bath Street, Santa Barbara, California
- Coordinates: 34.41868°N 119.70626°W
- Type: Art museum
- Website: http://www.casadolores.org

Casa Dolores, Center for the Study of the Popular Arts of Mexico is an art museum located on 1023 Bath Street in Santa Barbara, California.

The center is devoted to the collection, preservation, exhibition, and study of the popular arts throughout Mexico. Casa Dolores houses the Santa Barbara resident and art historian Linda Cathcart's collection of over 6,000 objects in various media: clay, wood, ceramic, natural fibers, leather, paper, glass, clay, and tin. Many of the pieces displayed in the museum are unique to various regions in Mexico, such as Talavera from Puebla, and Alebrijes from Oaxaca and Huichol art from the western highlands. Collections range from Pre-Hispanic to current day; artists whose works are displayed include Josefina Aguilar, Teodora Blanco, Candelario Medrano, Abelardo Ruiz, Rosa Real de Nieto and the Linares family.

The museum engages with the Santa Barbara community by providing culturally significant programs such as temporary exhibitions, art workshops, presentations, film series, and public events.

The museum is located in the Botiller Adobe house that was built in 1843, the oldest standing two-story adobe in Santa Barbara. The house was built and owned by the Pascual Botiller family from 1843 until 1969, and was purchased by Linda Cathcart in 2007.
