= Chicano nationalism =

Nationalist ideology of Chicanos

Chicano nationalism is the pro-indigenist ethnic nationalist ideology of Chicanos.

== Background ==
Violence and discrimination against Mexican Americans (usually against those of lower class and of visible Amerindian ancestry) continued into the 1950s and 1960s. Many organizations, businesses, and homeowners associations had official policies to exclude Mexican Americans. In many areas across the Southwest, Mexican Americans lived in separate residential areas, due to laws and real estate company policies. This group of laws and policies, known as redlining, lasted until the 1950s, and fall under the concept of official segregation. In many other instances, it was more of a general social understanding that Mexicans should be excluded from White society. For instance, signs with the phrase "No Dogs or Mexicans" were posted in small businesses and public pools throughout the Southwest well into the 60's.

Some members of the Mexican American community began to question whether assimilation was possible or even desirable. At the same time, a sense of ethnic consciousness and unity was forming, especially among the youth, around the plight of the farmworkers. Mexican Americans, some of whom began calling themselves "Chicanos" as a symbol of ethnic pride, also began to uncover their history and critically analyze what they learned in public schools. With this new sense of identity and history, the early proponents of the Chicano movement began viewing themselves as a colonized people entitled to self-determination of their own. Some of them also embraced a form of nationalism that was based on their perception of the failure of the United States government to live up to the promises that it had made in the Treaty of Guadalupe Hidalgo.

== Functions and basis ==
Chicano nationalism allowed Chicanos to define themselves as a group on their own terms, and was a determination on their part to mold their own destiny. It is rooted in the Aztec creation myth of Aztlán, a "northerly place". As the Aztecs are central to the conquest and history of Mexico, the use of the word took on the added dimension of the reclamation of an indigenous heritage as part of the decolonization process.

The sense of Chicano nationalism was enhanced by a geographical proximity of the United States and Mexico. Chicanos use the name Aztlán in reference to territories within the boundaries of the Mexican Cession, the land that was "granted" to Spain in 1493 by Pope Alexander VI in Bull Inter caetera, then claimed by the First Mexican Empire in 1821 when Spain signed the Treaty of Córdoba at the conclusion of the Mexican War of Independence, then claimed as "territories" (as opposed to "states", often referred to as "provinces") by 1824 Constitution, and finally ceded to the United States in 1848 as an outcome of the Treaty of Guadalupe Hidalgo (although it also included Texas, which had earlier proclaimed its independence from the government in Mexico City and was independent territory.)

The commitment to a nationalist ideology allowed Chicano activists to supersede differences that threatened their unity. Mexican Americans had regional, linguistic, age, cultural, racial, and gender differences, all of which were all subsumed to a mutual dedication to the Chicano Movement.

== Criticisms ==
Groups of Mexican nationalists, in Mexico, label Chicano nationalism as a form of separatism, similar to the Republic of Texas or black separatism which is opposed to their own idea of Reconquista and unification of Mexico according to the borders of the Adams–Onís Treaty. As Chicano identity may be only composed of people of predominantly or fully indigenous ancestries, Mexican nationalists believe the idea of Aztlan to be divisive and condemn Chicano nationalists for attempting to create a new identity for the Mexican American population, distinct from that of the Mexican nation which also includes people of European ancestry (mostly Spanish).

== See also ==
- Black nationalism
- Chicano
- Chicanismo
- Chicano movement
- Chicano studies
- Ethnic nationalism
- Irish nationalism
- White nationalism
