= Indigenismo in the United States =

Latin American political ideology in the United States

Indigenismo in the United States (Spanish: [indixeˈnismo]) is a nationalist ideology among Hispanic and Latin Americans, particularly Mexican Americans, which emphasizes the historical Indigenous ancestry of mestizos (Latinos of European and Indigenous descent). Indigenismo was a prominent aspect of 20th-century Chicano activism, with roots in Mexican nationalist state-sponsored Indigenismo policies dating to the 1920s. Central to Chicanismo is the idea that Chicanos are an Indigenous people, due to their partial Indigenous heritage, rather than descendants of European settlers. Mexican-American Indigenismo is sometimes called Chicano Indigenism. During the 1940s, the US federal government worked with the Mexican government to develop plans for Pan-American Indigenismo programs, which were partially implemented.

== History ==
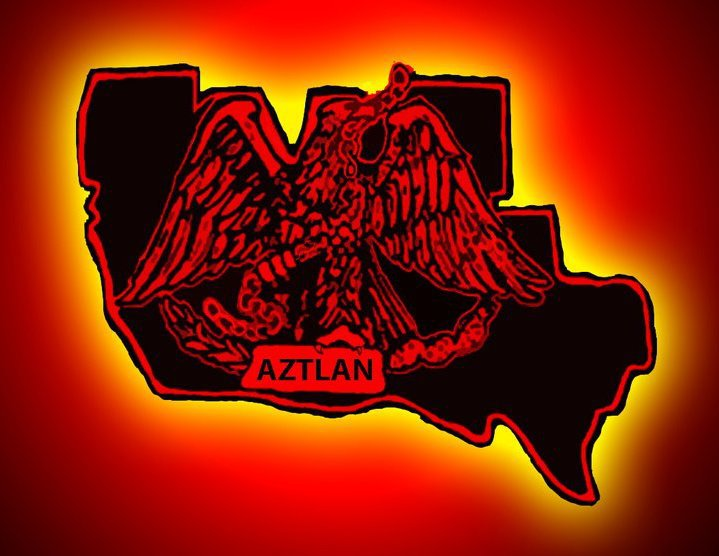
Chicanismo was based in the notion that Chicanos are Indigenous rather than immigrants or settlers by the situating of Aztlán in the Southwestern United States.

During the 1940s, the US and Mexican governments worked to promote a shared plan for promoting Indigenismo following the creation of the Inter-American Indian Institute (Instituto Indigenista Interamericano—III). The institute was created during the First Inter-American Indian Congress held in Pátzcuaro, Michoacán, Mexico, in April of 1940. On November 1 of 1941, President Franklin D. Roosevelt issued Executive Order 8930, which created the National Indian Institute of the Department of the Interior as the American affiliate of the Inter-American Indian Institute.

According to curator and educator Amalia Mesa-Bains, Indigenismo has played an integral role in the formation of Chicano identity and activism in the United States, with non-Indigenous Chicanos identifying with Indigenous Mexican heritage. In the 1960s and 1970s, in an effort to distance themselves from a white and/or mestizo identity, Chicano activists began to celebrate Indigenous and African ancestry. Many Chicano activists identified with Aztec ancestry, the Aztec Empire, and Aztlán.

Since at least the early 1970s, there has been internal criticism of Indigenismo within the Chicano/Chicana movement. Appeals to Mexica Aztec ancestry have been criticized as ignoring the diversity of Indigenous peoples in Mexico and ideals of mestizaje have been critiqued as emphasizing racial mixing while not valuing Indigenous Mexicans. The scholar Néstor Medina has critiqued cultural appropriation of Indigenous cultures within Mexican nationalist Indigenismo. Chicano Indigenismo has been critiqued for being influenced by state-sanctioned racist, eugenicist, and anti-Indigenous policies in Mexico and elsewhere in Latin America.

The academic Josefina Saldaña-Portillo, in her 2001 essay "Who's the Indian in Aztlán?", alleges that "indigenous erasure" as well as "appropriation of state-sponsored Mexican indigenismo" are problems within the works of Gloria Anzaldúa and other Tejano and Chicano writers.

According to the feminist artist Ester Hernandez, discussions of gender and sexuality have often been taboo within Chicano Indigenismo due to "patriarchal cultural nationalism" that emphasizes the centrality of race and class.

== See also ==
- Appalachia § Folklore and legends
- Aztlán
- Indigenismo
  - Indigenismo in Mexico
- Indigenous peoples of Mexico
- La raza cósmica
- Native American identity in the United States
- Meryan ethnofuturism
- Mestizo
  - Mestizos in Mexico
- Racism in Hispanic and Latino American communities
- Pretendian
- Taíno
