= Hayandose =

Hayandose is a cultural category used to express membership and belonging among Zapotec migrants, described by cultural anthropologist Lourdes Gutiérrez-Nájera. Hayandose entails a process of creating ethnically-marked spaces among migrants in an effort to combat feelings of marginalization and displacement in a host country. This concept may be compared to the notion of Native Hubs developed by anthropologist Renya Ramirez to describe how urban Native Americans negotiate a transnational existence.

== Beyond el Barrio ==
“Hayandose”, in Beyond el Barrio: Everyday Life in Latina/o America, examines the place of Indigenous people within the broader scope of Latino Studies and also within the national political landscape. As argued in the text, Indigenous subjects do not easily fit the category of "Latino" used to describe national identities; for example, Guatemalan, Mexican, Ecuadorian. At the same time, Indigenous migrants often are targets of racism and prejudice directed towards them. The essay is in conversation with other essays in the volume that interrogate the ways that Latinos carve out niches for themselves and thrive in urban spaces within the United States. As the essay Hayandose argues, such established spaces allow migrants, struggling with separation from their home country and racist stigmatization in their host country, to engage in a “meaningful practice of belonging” in which they are able to express their cultural membership. Hayandose marks the point at which people finally feel as though they belong through the discovery of themselves in a foreign place.

== Zapotecs/Gutiérrez-Nájera ==
Gutiérrez-Nájera uses Zapotecs as an example of migrants who originate from Oaxaca, Mexico and form their own spaces of belonging in the United States, specifically in Los Angeles. The Zapotecs that Gutiérrez-Najera writes about are from Yalálag, a small rural town in the heart of Oaxaca. The community of Yalaltecos in Los Angeles comes together collectively and participates in festivals, ceremonies, tandas and other small gatherings where they can gossip in Zapotec, share food, dance, financially and emotionally support one another, and engage in other customs and traditions from their place of origin. The existence and practice of customs and traditions that were once thought to be exclusive to Yalálag, but that have now permeated American society, demonstrates the transnational character of Yalaltecos Indigeneity that makes possible the process of Hayandose through the seizure and declaration of these ethnically-marked spaces. Yalaltecos living in Los Angeles have invoked their cultural identity hundreds of miles from home and have used it as a tool to resist the push for assimilation and marginalization within the United States. Therefore, the transmission and continuity of culture across national borders are essential for Yalaltecos to mark their own space and ultimately find themselves in a hostile environment far from their home country. With this new-found sense of belonging, the opportunity for “rally[ing] for indigenous rights and the development of hometown communities in Oaxaca, as well as to organize in the United States around immigrant legislation” no longer remains out of reach. This claim is reaffirmed by another scholar, Annice Jacoby, who argues that the affirmation of transnational identities allows “borders of ownership, space, and social agency” to be challenged. Once a migrant se hayan, or finds themselves, they have gained a sense of belonging by affirming their cultural membership and confronting their marginalization and displacement within a space collectively or individually marked as their own in the host country. This phenomenon then acts as a bridge for migrants to gain social ascendancy and acknowledgment that has the potential to improve lives in the home and host country alike.

== De/territorialization ==
Hayandose is also reflective of a contemporary cultural process known as de/territorialization. When emigrants moved to the United States they and their culture became deterritorialized. Once they moved, however, they are simultaneously reterritorialized as they begin to form a space for themselves and practice their customs and traditions as they did in their home country. The theory of de/territorialization can be seen in the Yalalteco community in Los Angeles through the perseverance of their cultural solidarity from Oaxaca to California, and the maintenance of community ties that traverse national boundaries. The theories of de/territorialization and Hayandose entail the movement of culture from one place to another, and thus reveal the “multiple centers” culture can obtain, as opposed to just a single "center" being the place of origin. Because migration causes displacement among emigrants who are forced to adapt to a new environment, culture, and way of living, bringing the culture and customs that they practiced in their places of origin to their new location helps to combat these negative feelings and also adds an additional “center” to their particular culture. In regards to Gutiérrez-Nájera’s example, Yalaltecos adopted Los Angeles as an additional “center” where their customs and traditions could be expressed as they would have been in Yalálag. This sharing of cultures creates a cultural flow between the United States and Oaxacan communities that have allowed emigrants not to lose their culture and sense of who they are, but to maintain it and ultimately use it as a powerful tool to engage in practices of belonging that resist sentiments of marginalization and displacement in new locations.
