= Eugenics in Mexico =

Following the Mexican Revolution, the eugenics movement gained prominence in Mexico. Seeking to change the genetic make-up of the country's population, proponents of eugenics in Mexico focused primarily on rebuilding the population, creating healthy citizens, and ameliorating the effects of perceived social ills such as alcoholism, prostitution, and venereal diseases. Mexican eugenics, at its height in the 1930s, influenced the state's health, education, and welfare policies.

Mexican elites adopted eugenic thinking and raised it under the banner of “the Great Mexican family” (Spanish: la gran familia mexicana).

== Global context ==
During the early twentieth century, eugenics became a popular method for population control and nation-building in many countries in Europe and the Americas. Its proponents sought to "improve" the human race through both positive and negative eugenic practices. Positive eugenics encouraged the procreation of the "fit," and negative eugenics advocated for the implementation of more radical actions such as marriage restriction and sterilization of the "unfit." The eugenics movement was not confined to Western European countries and the US. By the 1930s, almost every country in Latin America had been impacted by eugenics.

== Neo-Lamarckian eugenics ==
Unlike in other countries, the eugenics movements in Latin America were largely founded on the idea of neo-Lamarckian eugenics. Neo-Lamarckian eugenics stated that the outside effects experienced by an organism, throughout its lifetime, changed its genetics, permanently, allowing the organism to pass acquired traits onto its offspring. In the Neo-Lamarckian genetic framework, activities, such as prostitution and alcoholism, could result in the degeneration of future generations, amplifying fears about the effects of certain social ills. However, the supposed genetic malleability also offered hope, to certain Latin American eugenicists, as social reform would have the ability to transform the population, more permanently.

== Policy ==
According to scholars, eugenics in Mexico was largely preventative and focused on marriage restriction and sexual education. Leaders wanted to encourage the procreation of the "fit." The eugenics movement arrived in Mexico in the context of the widespread devastation and violence of the Mexican Revolution, which had resulted in a pronounced decline in population, as well as a growing nationalist sentiment. After almost a decade of brutal fighting, the country was seeking to rebuild not only its population but also its national identity. Prostitution, alcoholism, and venereal disease were all perceived as threats to the fitness of the Mexican population. Many eugenicists sought to eliminate such social ills, through control of reproduction, child-rearing, and hygiene.

=== Law of Familial Relations ===
Some of the origins of the eugenics movement can be seen in the 1917 Law of Familial Relations. While not passed at the height of the eugenics movement, the law was written with the intention of implementing population control and marriage restriction. According to the law, a man and a woman entering into marriage should have the legal aptitude to marry. Disabled people and those with venereal and other diseases that were perceived to be hereditary were barred from marriage, so that they can not procreate and damage the family unit and the interests of the species. Among other things, the law legalized divorce, on the justification that individuals should be allowed to separate from partners, legally, who might not be "fit" enough to reproduce.

=== Sex education ===
A key component of Mexican eugenics was education. Pieces of the revolutionary constitution focused on public education, which was meant to be available to everyone, regardless of social standing. In addition to the push for access to public education, the federal government attempted to bring sex education into schools. State efforts for education were connected to the eugenic agenda.

Those who were in positions of power, in the Department of Public Healthy and the Ministry of Public Education, were the same people who attended the First Mexican Congress of the Child, a conference on the application of eugenics to family building.

It was thought that sex education could prevent the degeneration of the race, by eliminating certain social problems, such as syphilis, tuberculosis, and alcoholism. In the 1930s, a committee appointed by the Secretary of Public Education issued a report on the necessity of sex education in Mexico. The committee argued that sex education was an absolute necessity, for healthy and normal development. The report concluded that a lack of sex education was the primary cause of negative personal habits and was responsible for the supposed decline of society.

The committee, under the Secretary of Public Education, put forth a set of recommendations to implement sex education programs in schools. The proposal, for this type of educational program, came with several stipulations, many of which echoed eugenic ideas. Pupils in elementary schools were to be classified, for example, according to their sex and capacities. Those who were deemed incapable should be moved to separate schools for physically, mentally, and morally abnormal students.

It would be the Department of Hygiene that had the ultimate authority of reclassification and reorganization of the abnormal. The committee's outline for sex education ended by stating that family health was the basis of the nation's "happiness" and "progress." Again, sex education and eugenic principles were often so closely linked. Many Mexican eugenicists sought to establish "educational norms."

=== Motherhood ===
The eugenics movement, in Mexico, had an intense focus on the role of the mother in cultivating a "fit" child. It was thought that there was an "inherent"' connection between mother and child that, if cultivated properly, would ensure the future of the nation. Puericulture, an idea focused on the role that mothers played in ensuring the "proper" hygiene of the child, shaped eugenic reforms in Mexico.

By the late 1920s and the early 1920s, multiple organizations and societies had been created to focus on the role of eugenics in caring for a child. The First Mexican Congress of the Child was held in 1921. Issues that were eugenic and sexual in nature were brought to the attention of the attendees, such as maternal health and the sterilization of criminals. In 1929, the Mexican Society of Puericulture (Sociedad Mexicana de Puericultura) emerged as another society influenced by eugenics. By then, the Society of Puericulture had created a branch dedicated to eugenics and addressed sex education, infantile sexuality, and disease in relation to caring for a child. The government was also preoccupied with the importance of puericulture. The Public Health Department's School Hygiene Service offered childcare education classes for women, went into poor communities to educate new mothers about infant hygiene, and built playgrounds.

=== Sterilization ===
In December 1932, the state of Veracruz passed the only eugenic sterilization law that has ever existed in Latin America. Proponents of the law advocated for it, because sterilization was, supposedly, in the interest of the species, race, and home.

When Adalberto Tejeda returned to the Veracruz governorship, in 1928, eugenics was integrated into his policy. He believed that prostitution, religious institutions, and alcoholism prevented the formation of fit national citizens. In 1930, he attempted to eliminate prostitution with Law 362, which sanctioned the state to "locate and treat" Veracruz citizens who have been diagnosed with venereal diseases. In Jalapa, women were rounded up, imprisoned, and then, forcibly treated for venereal disease, as part of a eugenic effort to eliminate prostitution and its "negative" health effects.

Two years later, Tejeda built upon the attempt at eugenic population control and treatment, with the passage of two laws. Law 121 founded the Section of Eugenics and Mental Hygiene in the public health department, responsible for studying the "physical diseases and defects of the human organism" that were naturally passed from parent to child. In addition, prostitutes, criminals, alcoholics, and other so-called degenerates were to be subject to statistical surveys and clinical examinations. Those who were deemed to be threatening to society were to be monitored.

Six months after the passage of Law 121, an addendum was passed that legalized sterilization of "the insane, idiots, degenerates, or those demented to such a degree that their defect is considered incurable or hereditarily transmissible." With the help of medical professionals, the Section of Eugenics and Mental Health was in charge of identifying people who needed to be sterilized. While the law passed, it is not clear whether or not individuals were actually sterilized, because of the lack of clarity in medical and historical records.

=== Argument against Indigenismo ===
State-directed policies to improve the situation of Mexico's Indigenous peoples and the ideology of Indigenismo in Mexico were generally opposed by urban intellectuals. With the founding of the Mexican Eugenics Society for the Improvement of the Race, in 1931, arguments against indigenismo employed arguments framed by eugenics. A 1936 editorial in the Mexico City newspaper Excelsior told readers "The Indians, with rare exceptions, are proof that the theory of environment cannot be sustained by scientific criteria.... The Mendelian theory of inheritance serves as a basis for vigorously opposing the humanitarian work of the Government. The norms of the contemporary Indians have been passed, from parents to their children, as a sacred trust, and it is no simple task to remove these obstacles."

== Legacy ==
Although the eugenics movement was at its most influential in the early twentieth century, some eugenic ideas continued to be present, in Mexico, throughout the 20th century. In the 1950s, the Public Health Department provided its employees with a genetic counseling service. Also, the acceptance of neo-Lamarckian genetics continued, for Mexican eugenicists, into the 1970s. The 21st century has also seen strains of the early eugenics movement. Fourteen indigenous women in Guerrero were forcibly sterilized, in 2001, and there have been similar accusations of the state's sterilization abuses against indigenous women in Hidalgo. The United Nations has brought such abuses to the international stage and denounced Mexico's actions.

In 2011, the Mexican government took steps to prevent sterilization abuse, by introducing a legal measure to make the practice punishable with prison time.

== See also ==
- Eugenics
- History of science and technology in Mexico
