= Chicanismo =

Ideology of the Chicano movement

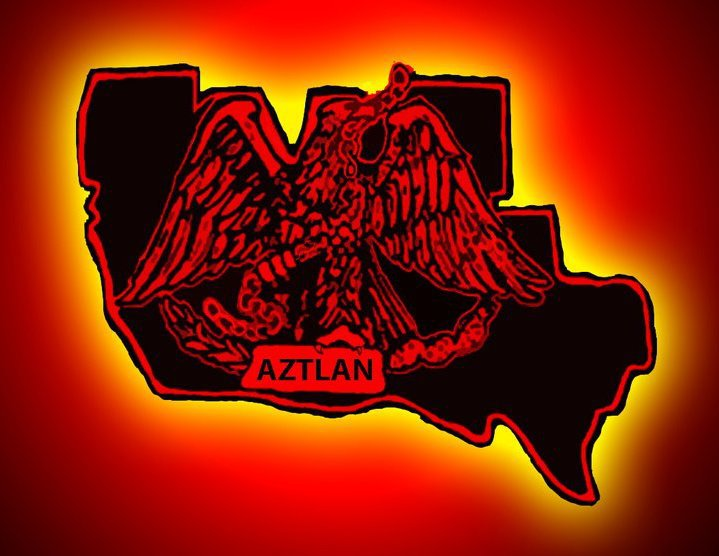
Chicanismo was based in the notion that Chicanos are Native rather than immigrants by the situating of Aztlán in the southwestern US.

Chicanismo (Spanish pronunciation: [tʃikaˈnismo]) emerged as the cultural consciousness behind the Chicano Movement. The central aspect of Chicanismo is the identification of Chicanos with their Indigenous American roots to create an affinity with the notion that they are Native to the land rather than immigrants. Chicano identification with Indigenous heritage is rooted in Mexican state-sponsored Indigenismo policies. Chicanismo brought a new sense of nationalism for Chicanos that extended the notion of family to all Chicano people. Barrios, or working-class neighborhoods, became the cultural hubs for the people. It created a symbolic connection to the ancestral ties of Mesoamerica and the Nahuatl language through the situating of Aztlán, the ancestral home of the Aztecs, in the southwestern United States. Chicanismo also rejects Americanization and assimilation as a form of cultural destruction of the Chicano people, fostering notions of Brown Pride. Xicanisma has been referred to as an extension of Chicanismo.

== Overview ==
During the early 1960s and 1970s, a great deal of Mexican Americans came together across the United States with the aim to fight for social and political change. This movement became known as the Chicano movement and can be defined as a social movement that emerged in the 1960s to protest the circumstances in which the Mexican American community found itself. This emotional, but predominantly nonviolent reform movement included several concerns of great importance to the community. Among these were the fear of cultural disintegration, the lack of economic and social mobility, rampant discrimination, and inadequate educational institutions. The movement would result in a shift in the way that Mexican Americans saw themselves in society. It was a question that had surfaced in the Mexican American community due to the barriers of oppression they felt once entering the United States. In order to combat these feelings of isolationism, the Chicano movement sought to unite all Chicanos, regardless of class. Communal empowerment was important to the movement because they were minorities in American society. This made it very important for community organizing in order to collectively advance their agenda. The movement was focused around the question of what it meant to be Mexican in American society. Chicano culture focused on a multiplicity of ideas that were held by the Mexican American community. Intellectuals and others involved in the movement, including artists and authors, created new forms of art that encompassed their culture. Examples included virtues of the Mexican Indigenous heritage and bilingual, sometimes polyglot, works of literature. Part of the movement's aim was to construct a history questioning the victimization of Mexican Americans by critiquing assimilation to American society and culture.

== Major themes ==
=== Nationalism ===
Nationalism served as the main pillar for the Chicano movement in the 1960s. Chicanismo is deeply rooted in the idea of cultural affirmation at all costs. It is through this self-determination of Chicanos that mobilization and organization on large scale and community levels would be possible. Their reliance on nationalism can be seen through their artistic and organizational goals and endeavors. All forms of Chicano artistic expression needed to celebrate heritage or they could not even be considered Chicano. Through an agenda based on nationalism and artistic treasures like "I Am Joaquin," a group of Mexican-Americans were able to come together under a new banner of Chicanismo, and they created a group of people with centuries of history that had been repressed until the Chicano movement.

The ideology of Chicano nationalism can be traced to Chicanos' experiences in America. Although society functioned in a way that encouraged assimilation, Chicanos fought hard to preserve their culture through a form of cultural nationalism, which emphasized the exact opposite of assimilation. Chicano ideas often were similar to the ideas of those who were fighting anti-colonial struggles in the way that both groups fight against a rhetoric or culture of dominance. This type of anti-imperialist message made it important for Chicanos of all classes to be united. The ideology of Chicanismo called for unity among all Chicanos, regardless of their class or social standing in order to fight against oppression. It was important for Chicanismo that no group of Chicanos were marginalized in the movement because that would contradict their message against marginalizing different groups of people. This allowed them to reconstruct their understanding later in the movement in order to involve undocumented Mexican immigrants in their struggle. This was important for two reasons: the sheer number of immigrants, and their need for assistance through the community because of the government's treatment.

=== Youth ===
The Chicano movement was characterized by inclusion of all classes. Because much of Chicano ideology had to do with dealing with the hardships of being a minority, Chicanos of all backgrounds were a part of the movement, not just adults. The Chicano movement involved heavy reliance on its youth. Many Chicano youths believed that they were more able to fight against American racism and push the Chicano agenda better than adults and this was evident through the participation of youths in the movement and also in the emphasis put on youths by the movement's leaders. Chicano students were crucial to the movement by providing analytical reasoning behind the philosophies and actions of the Chicano movement as a whole. The youth provided a majority of the people that participated in the Chicano protests, rallies, and marches as well.

It was at the first Chicano Youth Liberation Conference in Denver in March 1969 where the Chicano manifesto, "Plan Espiritual de Aztlán," was drafted. Sponsored by Corky Gonzales' organization, Crusade for Justice, the conference brought together the different populations of Chicanos involved in the movement. The conference focused on social revolution and cultural identity. It was also a goal for Gonzales to help connect the college educated students to the rural youth involved in the movement at the conference. This was important for Gonzales because he had observed many students had been leaving the community without coming back, and he wanted to facilitate relationships between the college educated and other Chicano youth. This was an important way to keep those in the community close to one another.

=== Mesoamerican heritage ===
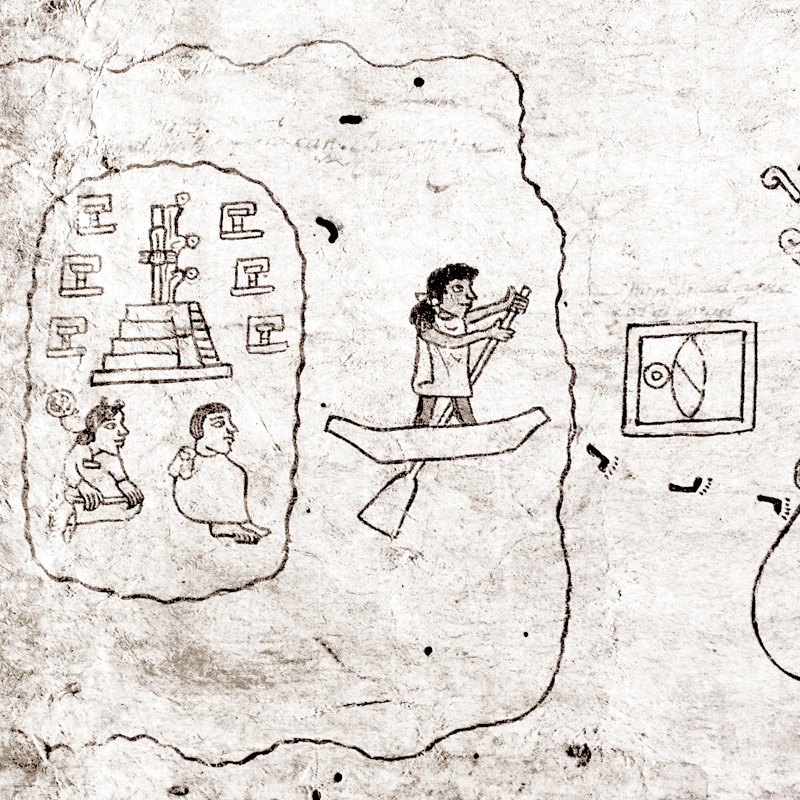
Detail of the first page of the Boturini Codex, depicting the departure from Aztlán

Much of Chicano culture draws upon the heritage that all Chicanos share. Leaders of the movement focused on ancient Mesoamerican heritage in order to include all Chicanos. Chicanos wanted to rely on an allusion to ancient heritage because Mesoamerican settlements in places like Colorado, New Mexico, and Arizona predated Euro-American settlement. Chicanos used this as a symbol to justify their claim to the land of Aztlan. Chicanos saw an important mission of theirs to have a culture of inclusion, especially since the movement began as a result of their experiences of oppression.

== Key figures ==
=== Rodolfo "Corky" Gonzales ===
Rodolfo "Corky" Gonzales (June 30, 1928 – April 12, 2005) was an influential political activist in the Chicano Movement. He is also well known as a boxer and for his poetry. Although there are no formal delegations as to who the founders of the Chicano Movement, Gonzales receives much consideration. His contributions to the movement are profound and long lasting. By 1960 Gonzales had become interested in politics and joined the Democratic Party. Under Johnson's administration he assumed the position of Director of Denver's War on Poverty office. After only a couple years he was disillusioned with the political process and denounced his role in order to found the Crusade For Justice in 1966. He made the primary goals of the crusade self-determination and community control of Chicano life. The Crusade created a number of establishments and organizations like schools and newspapers. They also were involved in Denver politics and lobbied for improved housing and educational opportunities for Chicanos in Denver.

Although Gonzales had been in the spotlight before due to his boxing career, in 1967 he once again garnered national attention for his landmark poem I Am Joaquín. This poem revolutionized the idea of the "Chicano" and served as a precedent for Chicano cultural affirmation. The poem questioned the role Chicanos played in the American system and called for them derive strength through denouncing economic assimilation:

And now!
I must choose
between
the paradox of
victory of the spirit,
despite physical hunger,
or
to exist in the grasp
of American social neurosis,
sterilization of the soul
and a full stomach.

This portion of the poem represents Chicanos' eagerness to sacrifice their physical bodies for the regeneration of the soul and provided Chicanismo with a sense of necessity and vigor. In the next section of the poem he refers to Joaquín as part of the many Indigenous groups such as the Maya and the Aztecs, but he also refers to him as Cortés and the Spaniards. How can this contradiction exist? It is an allusion to José Vasconcelos' idea of a "Cosmic Race." He creates a unifying agent among Chicanos and then calls for them to rise up against Anglo oppression. The last identifying term Gonzales uses in the poem is the word Chicano in order to enlist all those who identified with the poem under one banner.

His influence did not end with his poetry. In 1968, he was a part of a protest at West High School in Denver over inferior education that eventually broke out into a riot. In 1969, Corky convened the First National Chicano Youth Liberation Conference. It was here that the famed "Plan de Aztlán" was created. This document would become the design for the Chicano movement and was based on nationalism and self-determination. Corky placed a heavy importance on familial ties, and with his family devoted his entire life to servicing the needs of Chicanos in the Denver community.

=== César Chávez ===
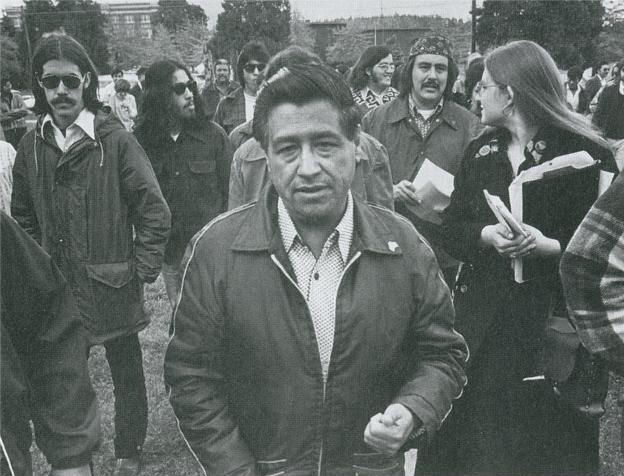
César Chávez visits Colegio Cesar Chavez in Mt. Angel, Oregon (1974).

César Chávez (March 31, 1927 – April 23, 1993) was a hugely influential labor rights activist. He, along with Dolores Huerta, created the United Farm Workers, which would become one of the most important organizations in the fight for labour rights of farmworkers. Chávez sometimes struggled with his connection to both the Chicano movement and the labor movement. He believed the labor movement should transcend racial boundaries but his fight revolved around agricultural workers and Mexican-Americans made up a huge amount of that particular group. This made it impossible for him to forgo ties to the movement and the public viewed him as a Chicano hero. He constantly gained national attention through protests, boycotts, marches, and many hunger strikes. Even more notable than these acts however, was the large organized boycott that the Chávez led UFW imposed on California grape growers. The result was the 1975 Agricultural Labor Relations Act, which greatly improved the conditions and protections of agricultural labourers. Whether he was comfortable with the dynamic or not, Chávez had a direct tie to the Chicano movement solely off the sheer number of workers that identified as such. He came to understand this and would employ symbolic imagery in order to garner support for his movements. He would champion ancestral ties and religious icons as well as plan protests and boycotts on specific days that were symbolic in the minds of Mexican-Americans and their fight for justice. He was known for his use of non-violent tactics and is still viewed today as one of the most important human rights activists of the 20th century in the U.S.

=== José Ángel Gutiérrez ===
José Ángel Gutiérrez (1940–) is an attorney and professor at the University of Texas at Arlington. He was the son of a Mexican-American doctor and grew up living a relatively privileged life. After his father died when he was 12, everything changed for him. He now was just another Mexican and both the other Mexicans and the white community started to treat him differently. He became very aware of the oppression of Mexican-Americans at a young age and this would inevitably lead to his lifelong involvement in their betterment. He was extremely prominent during the Chicano movement and was a founding member of the Mexican American Youth Organization (MAYO). Gutiérrez also helped found and was a past president of the Partido Nacional de La Raza Unida, or Raza Unida party. The Raza Unida Party was a Mexican-American political group that organized in order to support certain candidates up for election in Texas, California, and other southwestern states. Corky Gonzales later helped create a Denver faction of the Raza Unida Party. Behind Gutiérrez, the Raza Unida Party had many protest marches and boycotts. They were also quite successful in practicing participatory democracy. The Raza Unida Party successfully pooled votes and were able to fill a number of local positions in order to advance the position of Chicanos. He distributed a number of popular publications, one of which being a small, shoddily printed paperback; titled "A Gringo Manual on How to Handle Mexicans." He distributed his work any way he could and would even sell copies out of his trunk at times. He greatly aided the position of Chicanos in the educational community and in the political sphere as well.

=== Reies Lopez Tijerina ===
Reies Lopez Tijerina (1926–2015) was easily the most controversial leader in the Chicano movement in the 1960s and 1970s. He was also the most symbolic leader for the movement. José Ángel Gutiérrez said that Tijerina captured the imagination of all those involved in the Chicano movement and convinced them of their ties to U.S. land. He called to attention the complete disregard on the part of the U.S. government towards the supposedly protected Mexican land grants. When the judicial process was unsuccessful in returning the lands of the Mexican-American people, Tijerina turned to more drastic measures. He went on to create the Alianza Federal de Mercedes. The group sought to idealize Mexican heritage and also celebrated ancestral ties to Meso-America. Two major events that followed made him a permanent fixture in the memory of the Chicano movement. The first was the march he led on Santa Fe where he occupied part of the Carson National Forest because he believed the land belonged to the recipients of Mexican land grants. The state mobilized, and Tijerina was forced to give up after 5 days. The next major event he was a part of was a courthouse raid in 1967. These two events may not have had profound immediate effects, but both were extremely symbolic in nature and helped invigorate the Chicano movement. Tijerina's actions allowed Chicanos to become true believers in what the movement was fighting for, especially after his incarceration made him into a type of martyr. His legacy was important for the image of the Chicano movement.

=== Dolores Huerta ===
Dolores Huerta (1930–) is a Chicana feminist that worked directly with César Chávez and was a prominent leader of the United Farm Workers. In 1955, she began her calling as an activist by "helping Frank Ross to start the Stockton Chapter of the Community Service Organization, which fought for economic improvements for Hispanics. 'The CSO battled segregation and police brutality, led voter registration drives, pushed for improved public services and fought to enact new legislation.'" Huerta started on a small local level with her activist efforts but by the 1960s she had created the Agriculture Worker Association. "It was through her work at these organizations that Dolores met fellow activist and labor leader Cesar Chavez." After this, she and Chávez co-founded the UFW and soon garnered national attention to their fight for labor rights. Huerta was instrumental in the execution of the United Farm Workers' plans and often acted as the organizations head negotiator. She traveled the country giving speeches at colleges and in Chicano communities and served as a major role model for Chicanas all over the country. Her prominence in the movement helped inspire a new generation of women that were suffocating from oppression and had not realized their problems were wide spread. Huerta was one of the first notable Chicana activists and she became a symbol to Mexican-American women across the U.S.

=== Mirta Vidal ===
Mirta Vidal was a born in Argentina and migrated to the U.S. in her youth. She resided in New York City where she was a member of the Socialist Workers Party. She was in solidarity with the Chicano Movement and wrote different critiques. She was an intersectionalist and is best remembered for her critiques of the Chicano movement and of the Anglo feminist movement. The position, needs, and goals of Chicanas were relatively ignored even though the roots of the Chicano and Chicana movements were identical. In her article "Women: New Voice of La Raza", she chastises the use of machismo at home and in the Chicano monavement, likening machismo to the English term "male chauvinism." She argues the efforts of Chicana women are undermined and diluted. She draws attention to the fact that Chicanas experience oppression on multiple levels, as women, as Chicanas, and as lower-class workers. Vidal speaks to the exclusion of Chicanas from mainstream feminism and the Chicano movement. Feeling left out of the mainstream feminist movement because of their ties to the Chicano movement, and discouraged by Chicanos from participating in Women's Liberation because it was an "Anglo thing," Chicanas came together to confront their individual struggle. Vidal says that for Chicana women, it is necessary to be active within the Women's Liberation movement and within the Chicano Movement in order to achieve full liberation. Vidal's "New Voice of La Raza: Chicanas Speak Out" provides an example of what is known today as intersectionality, an important concept within feminism. In 1971, Elma Barrera organized the first National Chicana conference. In the statement she made, she antagonizes the men of the church and the men at home and then goes on to call for free and legal abortions and birth control for the Chicano community, controlled by Chicanas. At the conference, they drafted two manifestos that were called "Sex and the Chicana," and "Marriage-Chicana Style." These documents called for community organization and the right for women to control their own bodies. They also advocated the idea that mothers needed to change their role in the home and educate their children in a way that would re-shape traditional gender roles and behavior. Chicanas continued to meet and would gain some inclusion in both the Chicano and the Feminist movements.

== The Chicano Movement ==
The Chicano movement of the 1960s, also known as El Movimiento, was a movement based on Mexican-American empowerment. It was based in ideas of community organization, nationalism in the form of cultural affirmation, and it also placed symbolic importance on ancestral ties to Meso-America. Reforms the movement called for included restoration of land grants, farm workers' rights, and access to better educational opportunities. The movement revolved around the unity of the vast Mexican population in the US. There were a number of major events and organizations that spawned from the Chicano movement. The group participated in a number of student walkouts. Two occurred in Denver and East L.A. in 1968. These walkouts were hugely influential in the fight for equality in schools and better conditions for Chicanos. In 1970, they held the Chicano Moratorium. This was centered on opposing the Vietnam War and the complex intersectional discrimination the war supported. The Chicano movement was vehemently against the war and fought against it for a number of years. They even used the image of the Vietnamese as their comrade against the imperialist White-American forces. Another extremely important event for the movement was the National Chicano Youth Liberation Conference first organized by Rodolfo "Corky" Gonzales. This conference met for a number of consecutive years and its role as a unifying agent for Chicanos across the US cannot be understated. In its first meeting the conference would draft the "Plan Espiritual de Aztlán," which would become a sort of blueprint for the Chicano movement. It starts by addressing the idea that Chicanos must utilize their nationalism as a "common denominator for mass mobilization and organization." The document names their seven organizational goals as: unity in the minds of the people in the liberation of La Raza; economic control of their own lives and communities without exploitation; education that was relative to the Chicano; institutions that serve the people on a basis of restitution for past actions; self-defense that relies on the combined strength of the community; use of cultural values to strengthen the moral backbone of the movement; and political liberation through independent action. The document also entails actions to be made that included informing the public, performing large demonstrations and walkouts, and creating political parties and using participatory democracy. The Chicano movement is believed by some to have ended in the 1970s, but others have a view that the shift in intensity was caused by a cultural renaissance within the movement.

== Chicano art during and after the Movement ==
Chicano art became an integral part of the Chicano movement during the 1960s. This new artistic expression was energized through increased political activism and cultural pride. Many intellectuals view this internal artistic movement as a Chicano cultural renaissance. Chicano art was rooted in a number of strong ideologies, including community, activism, and ancestral ties. The murals, novels, newspapers, sculpture, paintings and other forms of expression created by Chicanos helped shaped Chicanismo and presented this newly formed group with hundreds of years of history. The artistic movement's role in the shaping of Chicano ideology cannot be understated. It was a movement based in Cultural affirmation and artistic expression was the premium method for Chicanos to go about this celebration of heritage and liberty.

As time passed, Chicano art continued to transform and take the shape of the community it revolved around. Many Chicano artists focused on representations of "el barrio" and they sought to connect to their audience by championing their daily struggles. Reliance on the community structure remained imperative and many galleries that supported the youth in Chicano areas were formed. Graffiti also becomes a vital reflection of Chicano art in Chicano neighborhoods. In the piece "Phantom Sightings: Art After the Chicano Movement," authors Rita Gonzalez, Howard Fox, and Chon Noriega detail the many transformations Chicano art takes on and the debate that follows. As the movement lost some of its vigor, intellectuals started to debate just what could be considered Chicano art. This debate claimed that art could not be mainstream in any way and must go against the grain of classic European artistic notions. Nobody ever came to a conclusion on the specificities of Chicano art and most forms that champion culture, community, or Meso-American ties are considered forms of Chicano art.

== See also ==
- Caló
- Rodolfo Gonzales
- Pachuco
- Aztlán
- Chicano
- Chicano literature
- Chicano movement
- Chicano nationalism
- Chicano poetry
- Chicano studies
- History of Mexican-Americans
