= Indigenismo =

Latin American political ideology

Indigenismo (Spanish: [indixeˈnismo]) is a political ideology in several Latin American countries which emphasizes the relationship between the nation state and Indigenous nations and Indigenous peoples. In some contemporary uses, it refers to the pursuit of greater social and political inclusion for Indigenous peoples in Latin America, whether through nation-wide reforms or region-wide alliances. This type of indigenismo seeks to vindicate Indigenous cultural and linguistic difference, assert Indigenous rights, and seek recognition and in some cases compensation for past wrongdoings of the colonial and republican states. Some historical figures like José Martí are classified as having been both indigenistas and hispanistas.

== Indigenismo in Cuba ==
The legal scholar Larry Catá Backer has written that Indigenismo in Cuba is an "indigenismo without Indians...where the memory of the Indian is revered", but where Indigenous peoples have disappeared into a "singular but blended mass". In such a "Cuba without Indians", the Cuban government supporting the rights of Indigenous peoples everywhere is a way to assert the rights of Cuba as a nation without Cuba having to address "the issue of its own Indians". Backer writes that Fidel Castro and José Martí have been major political figures who have promoted Cuban Indigenismo.

== Indigenismo in Mexico ==
Originally, indigenismo was a component of Mexican nationalism that consolidated after the Mexican Revolution. This indigenismo lauded some aspects of Indigenous cultural heritage, but primarily as a relic of the past. Within the larger national narrative of the Mexican nation as the product of European and Amerindian mestizaje, indigenismo was a component of Mexican nation-building, and an expression of freedom for an imagined, reclaimed identity that was stripped during the Spanish colonization of Mexico.

During the administration of Plutarco Elías Calles (1924–28), Moisés Sáenz, who held a doctorate from Columbia University and was a follower of John Dewey's educational methods, implemented aspects of indigenismo in the Department of Public Education. Sáenz had initially taken an assimilationist position on the "Indian problem," but after a period of residence in the Purépecha community of Carapan, he shifted his stance to one focusing on the material conditions affecting the Indigenous. He influenced the administration of Lázaro Cárdenas (1934–40), which established the cabinet-level position of the Department of Indigenous Affairs in 1936. The department's main efforts were in the economic and educational spheres. Cárdenas valorized Indigeneity, as indicated by the creation of the cabinet-level position and resources put into Indigenous communities. In 1940, Mexico hosted a multinational meeting on indigenismo, The Congress of Inter-American Indigenism, held in Pátzcuaro, where Cárdenas himself addressed the gathering. President Miguel Alemán reorganized the Mexican government's policies directed at the Indigenous by creating the National Indigenist Institute (Instituto Nacional Indigenista or INI). In the Vicente Fox administration, the unit was reorganized and renamed.

The valorization of Indigeneity was rarely carried over to contemporary Indigenous people, who were targeted for assimilation into modern Mexican society. Though the authors of Indigenist policies saw themselves as seeking to protect and relieve Indigenous people, their efforts did not make a clean break from forced assimilation practices of the pre-revolutionary past.

== Indigenismo in Peru ==
In Peru, it was initially associated with the APRA movement founded by Víctor Raúl Haya de la Torre (1924). The then left-wing APRA dominated Peruvian politics for decades as the singular well-organized political party in Peru not centered on one person. To some APRA or "Aprismo" in its initial form stood for the nationalization of foreign-owned enterprises and an end to the exploitation of the Indigenous peoples. To others it was about the combining of modern economics and technology with the historical traditions of the countryside and Indigenous populations to create a new and unique model for social and economic development.

Ethnocacerism is an ethnic nationalist Indigenous political movement in Peru associated with Antauro Humala, brother of ex-president Ollanta Humala with whom he carried out the Andahuaylazo, a failed coup d'état.

== Indigenismo in the United States ==
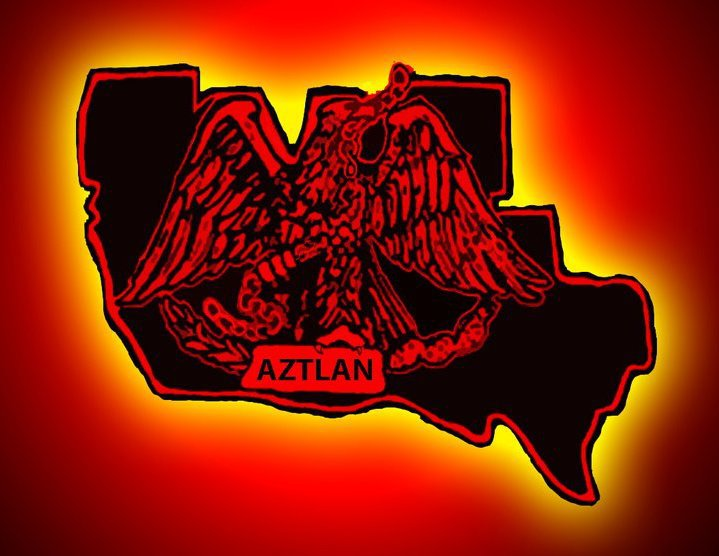
Chicanismo was based in the notion that Chicanos are Indigenous rather than immigrants or settlers by the situating of Aztlán in the southwestern US.

Indigenismo in the United States is an ideology found among some Chicanos/Mexican Americans, with roots in 20th-century state-sponsored Indigenismo policies in Mexico. Indigenismo in the Chicano movement encourages white/mestizo Chicanos to identify with Indigenous Mexican heritage, rather than with Spanish or European heritage. Chicano Indigenismo has been an important or central element of Chicanismo during the 20th century and into the 21st century. However, Indigenous people and some individuals within the Chicano movement have been criticizing Indigenismo since at least the early 1970s, rejecting the ideology's emphasis on historical heritage rather than connections to contemporary Indigenous communities, as well as Indigenismo's ties to racism, eugenics, anti-Blackness, and anti-Indigeneity in Mexican politics.

== See also ==
- United Nations Declaration on the Rights of Indigenous Peoples
