= Indigenismo in Mexico =

Political ideology in Mexico

Indigenismo is a Latin American nationalist political ideology that began in the late nineteenth century and persisted throughout the twentieth that attempted to construct the role of Indigenous populations in the nation-state. The ideology was particularly influential in Mexico where it shaped the majority of Indigenous-state relations since its incorporation into the Constitution in 1917. While the perspectives and methods of Indigenistas changed and adapted over time, the defining features of Mexican Indigenismo are the implementation by primarily non-Indigenous actors, the celebration of Indigenous culture as a part of the nation's history, and the attempt to integrate Indigenous populations under the authority of the nation-state. The ideology was enacted by a number of policies, institutions, governmental programs, and through artistic expression. These included education programs, land reform, political reform, and economic development as well as national displays of Indigenous heritage. Although generally viewed as beneficial for creating a platform to discussing Indigenous issues, Indigenismo has been criticized as still operating under colonial paradigms of racial hierarchy and often helped to solidify some stereotypes of Indigenous peoples even while trying to break down others.

== Post-Revolution ==
The Mexican Indigenista movement flourished after the Mexican Revolution of 1910-1920. Prior to the Revolution, under the presidency of Liberal General Porfirio Diaz, from Oaxaca and himself having Indigenous antecedents, his policy makers, known as Cientificos ("scientists") were influenced by French Positivism and Social Darwinism and thinkers such as Herbert Spencer. They saw white European ethnicity as superior and sought to build the nation toward a European model. Porfirian state development policies implemented laws of the Liberal Reform passed in the 1850s, which included dispossessing rural lands, particularly Indigenous community lands under the Lerdo Law; collective Indigenous groups being integrated as individuals by coercion, and expanding rural education aimed at creating a reliable workforce. In the aftermath of the Revolution the new government incorporated indigenismo as an official ideology into the 1917 Constitution, which claimed to strive for the emancipation of previously exploited Indigenous peoples through integration into the Mexican state.

Mexican policies of indigenismo were influenced largely by Columbia University-trained Mexican anthropologist Manuel Gamio. In his 1915 book Forjando Patria (Forging a Nation) he advocated for the study of Indigenous groups in order to determine which cultural traits to preserve and which to improve in order to create a unified nationalist state Gamio stated that Indigenous people have the same intellectual capability and that their perceived cultural inferiority is a product of their history of oppression and current disadvantaged environment. With improved education and living conditions, he believed Indigenous groups would accept acculturation and "embrace contemporary culture" Gamio was instrumental in directing his young nephew, Miguel León-Portilla, who went on to be a leading authority on Nahua thought and history, to study Nahuatl with Ángel María Garibay. Garibay published translations of Aztec texts and created the field of Nahuatl literature.

While the first decade of revolutionary presidencies of Venustiano Carranza (1917–1920), Adolfo de la Huerta (1920), Álvaro Obregón (1920–1924), and Plutarco Elías Calles (1924–1928) saw the start of change in terms of improving education and land reform these administrations still saw Indigenous populations as an obstacle to progress and their policies were geared toward modernizing and improving Indigenous populations to fit into civilized national culture. All of the presidents in the immediate aftermath of the Revolution were from northern Mexico; Carranza, Nuevo León; De la Huerta, Obregón, and Calles, Sonora), a region very different from central and southern Mexico (Mesoamerica), where great civilizations had arisen before the arrival of the Europeans. The revolutionary general most associated with Mexico's Indigenous population in central Mexico was peasant leader Emiliano Zapata from Morelos, who was murdered by an agent of Carranza in 1919. Obregón and Calles both distributed land under the tenets of Article 27 of the Mexican Constitution of 1917, allowing the Mexican state to expropriate property. Calles distributed 3,045,802 hectares to over 300,000 people living in rural areas, many of them Indigenous. Much of this land was ill-suited for agriculture or even barren. It is debated whether Calles's land redistribution was done for concern for the well-being of rural citizens or used as a tool to gain political support from rural areas. When Lázaro Cárdenas of the southern Mexican state of Michoacán became president in 1934, land reform in Mexico again became a high priority.

=== Education reform ===
Reform of rural education became a national priority when President Alvaro Obregon appointed José Vasconcelos to begin to combat rural illiteracy in 1920. Vasconcelos would eventually be appointed the director of the new Ministry of Public Education (SEP) in 1921. Vasconcelos was a nationalist who believed a culturally homogeneous mestizo state was necessary to create a strong, modernized Mexico. He is known for his phrase describing Mexico's population, the "cosmic race," a blending of Indigenous and Europeans. His indigenous education policies then were aimed at assimilation and de-Indianizing Indigenous groups so they became a part of mestizo national culture. Prior to 1920 national education policy had emphasized decentralized local control. By reversing this policy and giving Vasconcelos and SEP centralized control nationwide education, Obregón and Calles used education to extend federal control and aimed at acculturating indigenous populations into national citizens In addition to the SEP, Vasconcelos created the Department of Indigenous Culture in 1921 to facilitate the "incorporation [of indigenous peoples] into the dominant European culture" through the rural federal schools. Vasconcelos emphasized racially inclusive national schools to break down racial differences, as well as training rural teachers to educate rural children and parents within and outside of the school. His hope was that national mestizo cultural practices would spread through teachers to transform rural communities and create a patriotic national identity through "technological diffusion, agrarian reform, political mobilization, and nationalist propaganda". Vasconcelos' SEP taught reading and writing to over 37,000 illiterate peasants and the Department of Indigenous Culture created 1,926 rural schools and trained 2,388 teachers from its creation to 1924

=== Art and literature ===
Both Gamio and Vasconcelos, along with other indigenistas, saw creating national artistic and cultural production as essential to creating a national identity and used the romantic image of Indigeneity in creating a national culture through state sponsored art production starting in 1920 until 1940. Manuel Gamio argued that Mexican artists' inspiration should be derived from ancient Indigenous aesthetics, from the Aztec in particular.

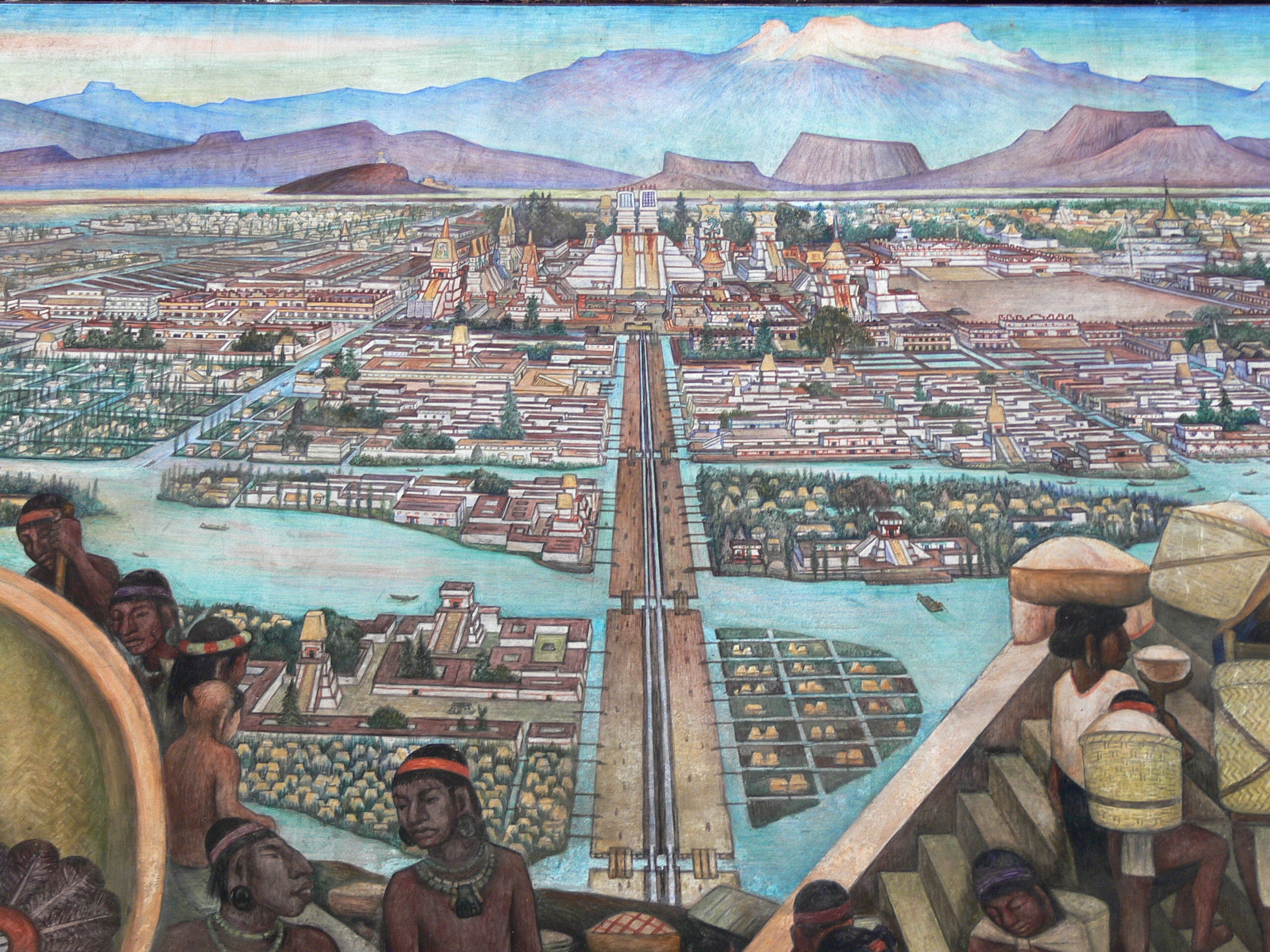
Mural by Diego Rivera showing the pre-Columbian Aztec city of Tenochtitlán. Muralists depicted Indigenous Mesoamerican civilizations with idyllic model characteristics as socially, spiritually and morally advanced societies and culturally superior than the Spanish as a way to promote an indigenist nationalism.

During the Revolution, Indigenous images were used as official nationalist symbols and after the revolution the government continued to use Indigenous symbols to establish the roots of Mexican culture and identity within the physical nation state Vasconcelos was appointed to be head of the cultural development program under Obregón, and began to commission artists to create national artwork supported by the revolutionary government, specifically focused on large public works that were visible and accessible to the people in order to solidify the national identity. Artists who contributed to this movement include Diego Rivera, Orozco, and David Alfaro Siqueiros. Much of this expansive artistic production was done in the form of murals on public buildings. Rivera alone created at least 124 murals over 8 years, including murals on Nacional Palace of Mexico, the Cortes Palace in Cuernavaca and the National School of Agriculture. These images very often depicted Indigenous figures and symbols as a celebration of pre-colonial Mexico.

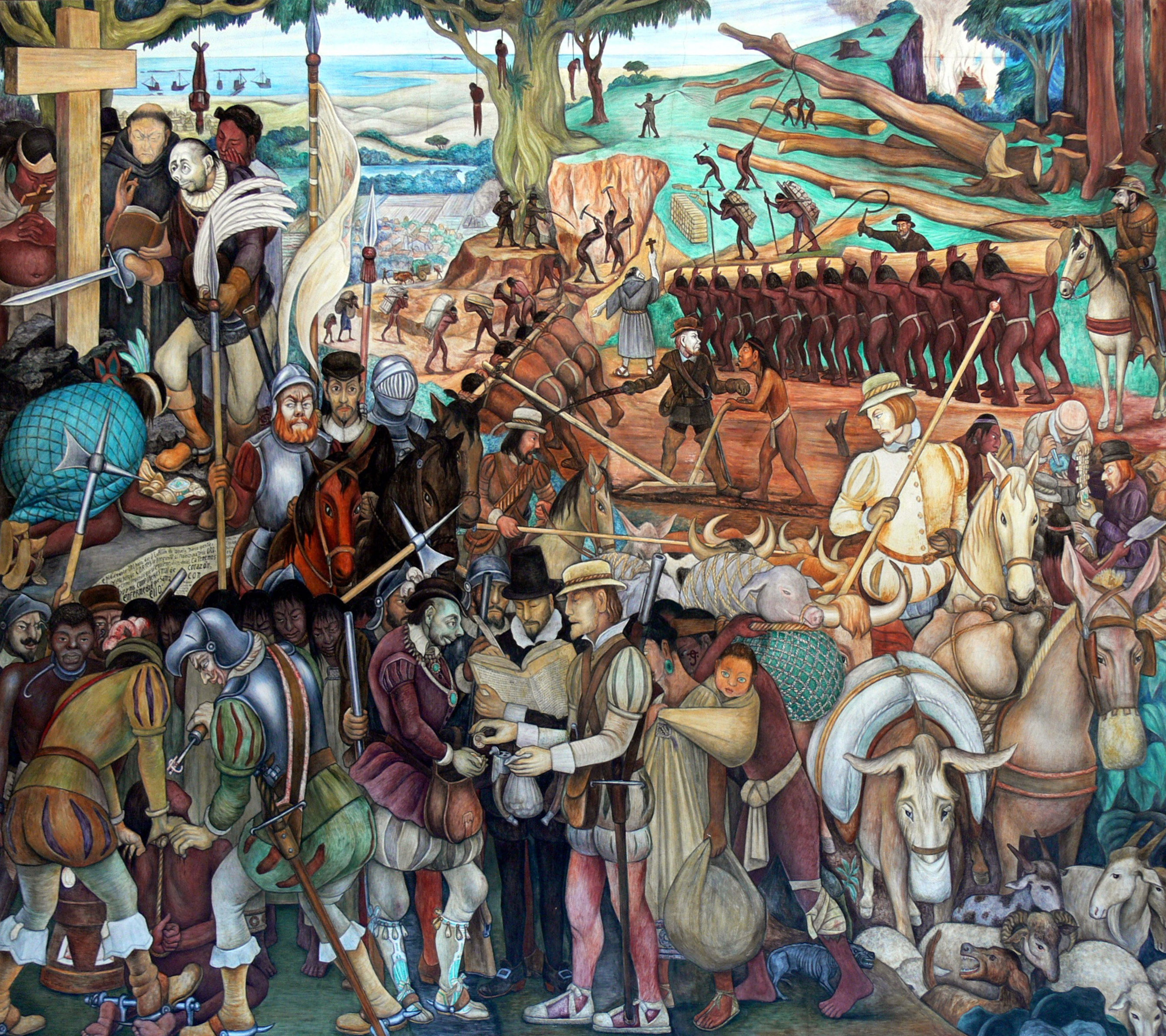
Muralists were often influenced by the Black Legend and Marxist dialectics of the class struggle, depicting the Indigenous peoples as the oppressed class (an analogy of the worker and the proletariat) while the bourgeois ruling oppressing class would come to be represented by the Spanish, Criollos, rich Mestizos and the Catholic church.

In the view of Guillermo Bonfil Batalla, a Mexican anthropologist, while Indigenous people were often depicted as a symbol of national pride and cultural heritage, they were depicted as relics of the past with little recognition of existing Indigenous groups. The aspects of Indigeneity that were depicted were selectively chosen as those most appealing such as the calm, campesino life and traditional crafts, dance, and popular folklore. Rivera's first mural under Vasconcelos' commission, titled Creation, is described by Rivera as a racial history of Mexico and demonstrates the cultural hierarchy present in the Indigenismo ideology as the primitive-looking Indigenous figures look up to the enlightened European figures who have come to save them from their misery with education. Even while these artists helped create the mestizo identity, they often created images that displayed ideas and images of Indigenous peoples that conflicted with the goals of the nationalist government.

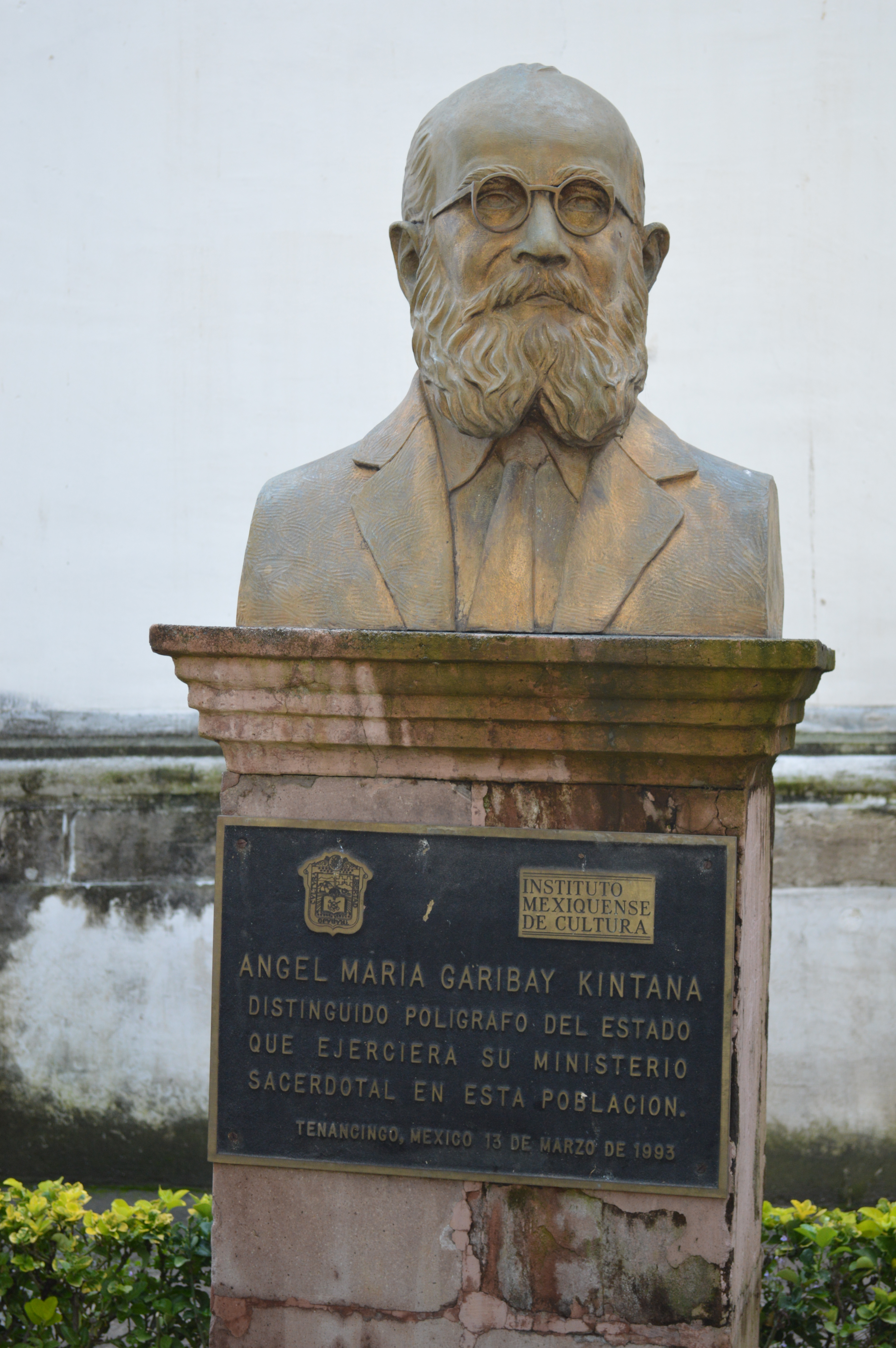
Bust of Ángel Garibay K. founder of the field of Nahuatl literature

After 1940, muralism was deemphasized to create national identity. Different forms of art and culture production were still used to form and shape national identity such as music, crafts, architecture, and literature, and still incorporated aspects of a romanticized Indigenous heritage. Another way Indigenous heritage was celebrated and publicly displayed was through museums. The largest and best known project is the National Museum of Anthropology in Mexico City constructed in 1964 to house the extensive national collection of Indigenous cultural artifacts. The museum displays and celebrates Mexico's precolonial past and Indigenous roots. Critics of Indigenismo have commented on how the museum is structured around primarily Aztec exhibits and artifacts, while the exhibits dedicated to existing Indigenous groups in Mexico are positioned to the side and are often overlooked by visitors. They have also noted that the language used in the Museum places the greatness and achievements of Indigenous people in the past.

The creation of Aztec literature as an academic field was spearheaded by Ángel María Garibay K., a Mexican linguist and translator of Nahuatl and Spanish texts of the prehispanic and colonial eras, and gave scholarly standing to the native literature of Mexico. Garibay and his student Miguel León-Portilla published works by Aztec poets written down in the colonial era as alphabetic texts. As the Mexican government supported expressions indigenismo, the establishment of Nahuatl literature with scholarly standing has been seen an integral part of that nationalist state-sponsored project.

== Under Cárdenas (1934-40) ==
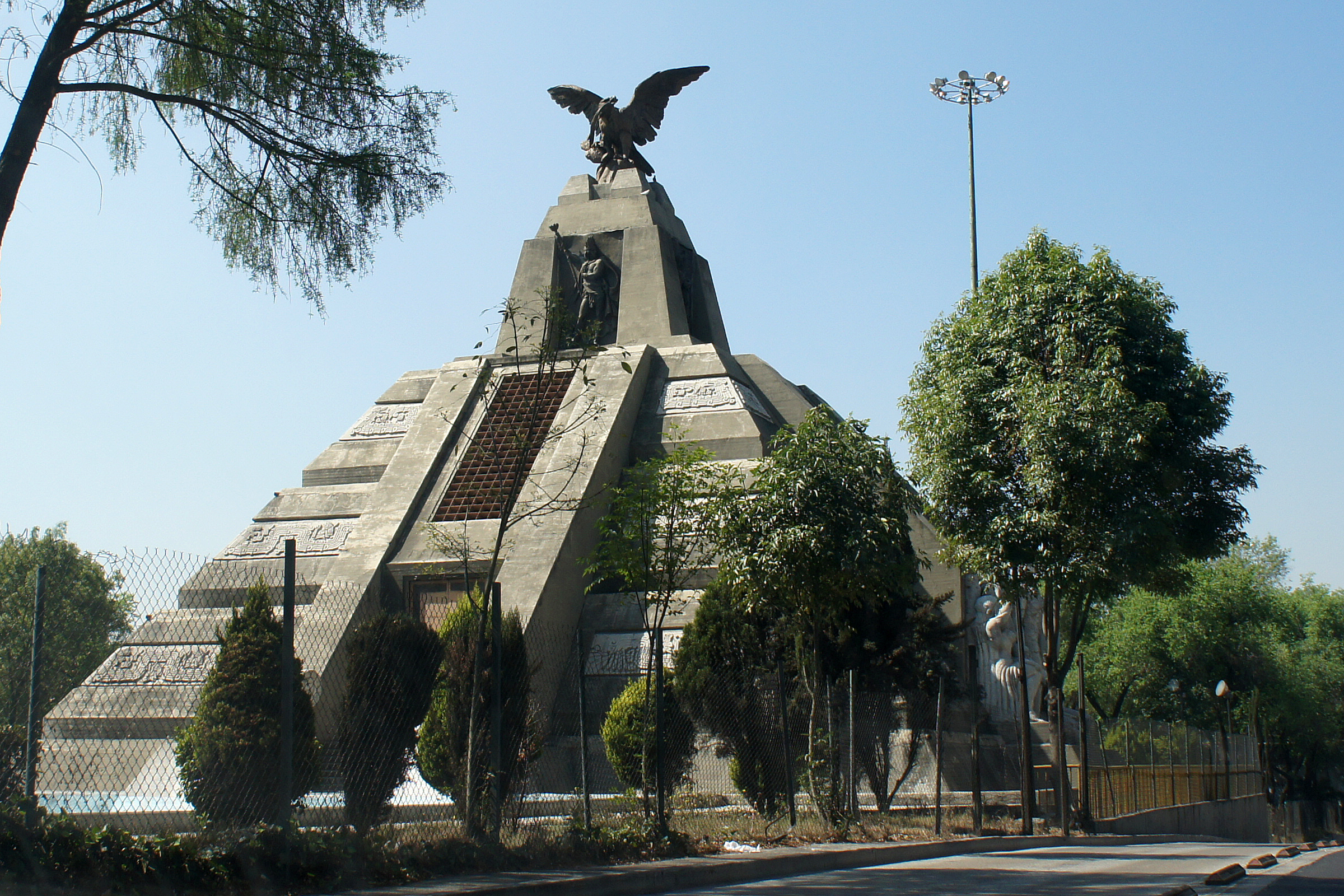
The Monumento a la Raza in Mexico City, built during the Cárdenas presidency, features multiple Indigenous elements.

Under the presidency of Lázaro Cárdenas (1934–1940) policies of indigenismo expanded. After observing the economic and educational struggles experienced by Indigenous communities on his presidential campaign tour and his experience as governor of Michoacan prior to becoming president, Cárdenas stated that it was the government's responsibility to help Indigenous peoples become modern citizens of Mexico at a speech in San Cristóbal de Las Casas, Chiapas on February 25, 1934. In that speech, he promised to "convert [the Indians] into men capable of intellectual development, and an active economic force struggling for the advancement of their race." His administration created policies of planned acculturation to integrate the Indigenous population into the national Mexican state. These policies included artisan projects, technical training to modernize indigenous economies as well as educational programs to culturally and socially integrate Indigenous groups and promote mestizaje. Cárdenas expressed his support of Indigenous incorporation when he stated the solution to the Indian problem was to "Mexicanize the Indian" and make them citizens at a speech at the 1940 First Inter-American Indigenous Conference on Indian Life. His administration experimented with policies, new bureaucratic structures, and administrators with particular ideas about Indigenous peoples and their relationship to the Mexican state and culture.

=== Educational reform ===
The SEP during Cárdenas presidency increased the number and quality of schools for indigenous communities. Cárdenas was also an advocate for bilingual education and in 1939 the SEP started a bilingual education program, where indigenous schools were taught in regional languages then slowly transitioned to Spanish. This was the first time national education programs used indigenous languages to acculturate indigenous children. To support this program, bilingual teachers were trained to educate indigenous communities formally, linguistically, and culturally. Ultimately, a lack of proper use of Indigenous languages by bilingual teachers and indigenous resistance to cultural education meant the project only succeeded at acculturating individuals as opposed to creating regional social transformations.

=== Department of Indigenous Affairs ===
In January 1936, the Cárdenas administration established of the Department of Indigenous Affairs (DAI) in 1936, which Mexican ethnologist and diplomat Moisés Sáenz helped plan. The department's primary agenda was facilitating a combination of advocacy, education, and economic development. The first director of the DAI was Graciano Sánchez, who had worked to supplant local agrarian leagues in Tamaulipas in favor of peasant organizations connected to Cárdenas's confederation of campesinos. This administrative pick points to Cárdenas's desire to mobilize peasants politically under the control of the Mexican state. Important DAI personnel were procuradores, who collected ethnographic information about Indigenous peoples, who acted as intermediaries between the Indigenous and the Mexican state. These intermediaries brought Indian complaints to federal agencies regarding ejido grants and limits, irrigation and other water rights, issues of real importance for Indigenous communities. In 1937-38, the procuradores forwarded some 11,000 complaints, which brought about change in ejidal authorities, prompted actions against judicial authorities in favor of Indians and campesinos, resolved conflicts between Indians and the Banco Crédito Ejidal. The number of wins for the Indigenous was relatively modest overall, but for those it benefited these were important. During Sánchez's tenure, authority over Indigenous schools was transferred from the Ministry of Education (SEP) to the Department of Indigenous Affairs. The results were disastrous for that experiment in Indian education. Sánchez left the DAI to oversee the Confederación Nacional Campesina and was replaced by the scholar Luis Chávez Orozco.

The Department was later renamed Department of Autonomous Indigenous Affairs (DAAI). The DAAI would accomplish its agenda through scientific research to understand Indigenous peoples and issues then create executive policies to respond to those issues. The DAAI ceased to exist by 1947, in the years when Mexico was concentrating on modernization and industrialization, often called the Mexican Miracle. DAAI was replaced with the National Indigenist Institute (INI) in 1948. The failure has been attributed to the delay in the creation of the National Institute of Anthropology and History (INAH) in 1939, which stagnated the progress of the DAAI.

=== Land reform ===
To improve the economic conditions in rural areas, Cárdenas distributed an average of 22 hectares to 811,157 people from 1928–1940, which was more than all his predecessors combined for the purpose of creating communal farms or Ejidos. These ejidos acted as a new administrative unit that incorporated Indigenous communities into the structure of the state. When faced with Indigenous resistance to state land reform, agrarian teachers were sent to educate them on benefits institutionalized reform. Due to continued resistance from Indigenous communities as well as resistance from large landowners, and the failure of communal land systems to sustain the growing rural population, Cárdenas's land reform remained largely incomplete. While overall national poverty was reduced, there were still large disparities in wealth between urban and rural communities and even larger ones between non-Indigenous and Indigenous communities.

=== First Inter-American Conference on Indian Life ===
In 1940, Cárdenas hosted delegates and participants from 19 American countries, totaling 250 people, at a conference in Pátzcuaro, Michoacan, Mexico to discuss and reevaluate the role of Indigenous populations in American nations. The conference was mainly run and organized by Mexican education reform advocate and indigensita, Moises Saenz. Saenz was an active proponent that cultural pluralism was the only way to accomplish integration of Indigenous groups into the national identity as citizens. The importance of this conference was the potential change in scale to continental Indigenismo and the creation of a Pan-American system. After discussion of a number of topics concerning Indigenous populations the conference came up with two main objectives. They worked toward improving all aspects of Indigenous life and working to protect and preserve their diverse customs and traditions. The conference also decided to establish the Inter-American Indian Institute (III) "an intergovernmental body specializing in the Indian question" which would supplement the individual national Indigenous departments. Saenz was appointed as the director of the Institute, but was killed in a car accident the following year. Gamio was later elected as director of the Institute.

Due to the inability of its small members to contribute funds, the economic toll of World War II and a change in Mexico's administration which had been its biggest supporter, the III became largely unfunded and had to turn to foreign funding to implement the projects agreed upon at and after the conference. This funding came largely from private investment companies from the United States, which limited what types of projects would be funded. With the start of the Cold War came a change in US foreign policy and III project resources became very scarce.

== Under Echeverría (1970–1976) ==
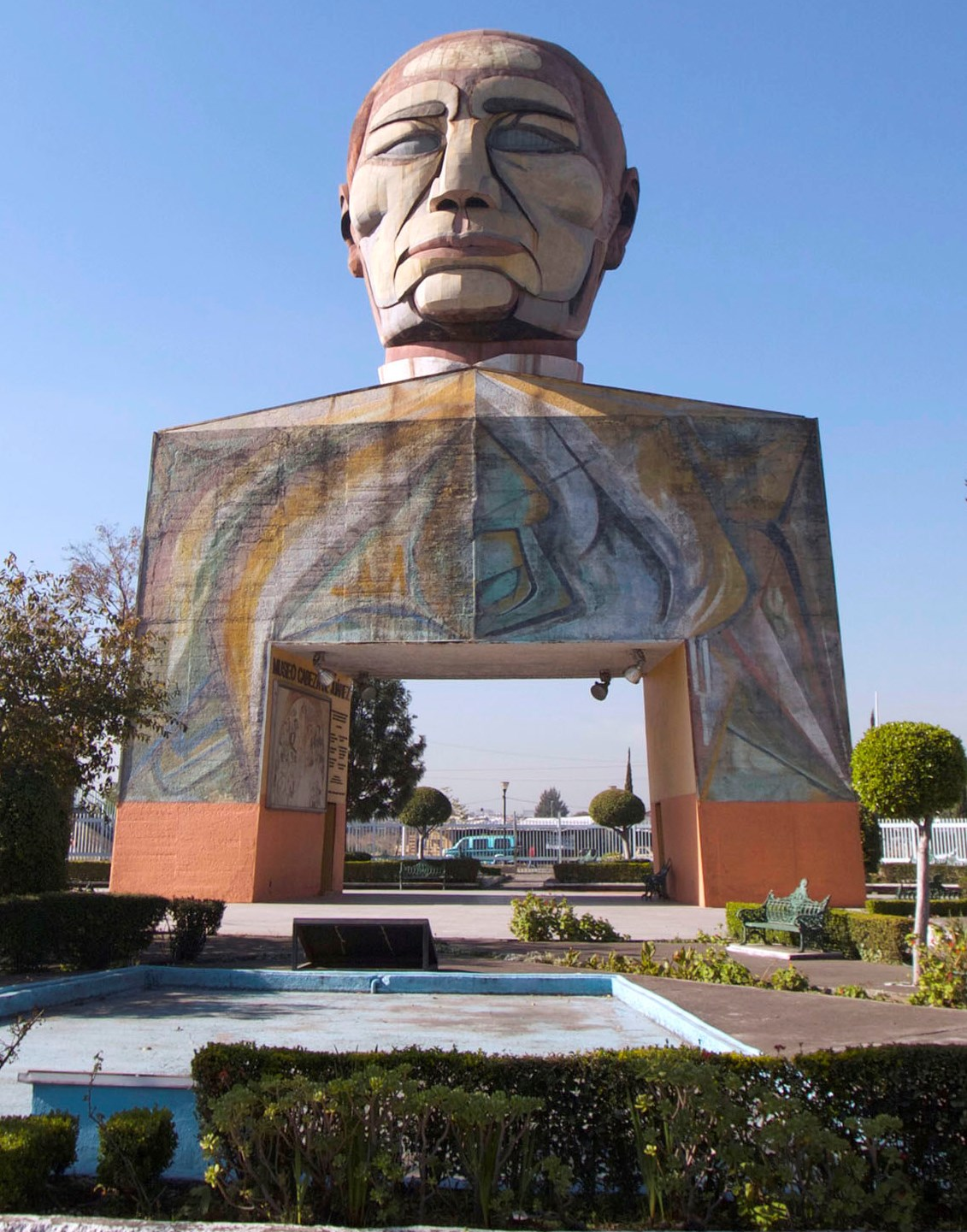
The Cabeza de Juárez monument, built to honor Benito Juárez, a Zapotec politician

Luis Echeverría served as President of Mexico from 1970-1976. He attempted to resurrect the populist presidency of Cárdenas and expanded on his Indigenista policies. These policies up to this point had been purely determined and directed by government officials. In 1970, Echeverría publicly announced his concern of the lack of Indigenous participation in national intellectual and civic discourse and stated Indigenous peoples were at risk to "become foreigners in their own country". Echeverría intended to change Indian policies so Indigenous groups became active participants in the development and had a voice in determining policy with "participatory Indigenismo". While his administration made unprecedented attempts to respect ethnic pluralism, its goal remained political, social, and economic integration of the Indigenous population. Early in his career he met with the Instituto Nacional Indigenista (INI) and promised to commit to the economic and political development of Indigenous communities by increasing funding for the INI. From 1970 to 1976 the INI's budget was increased from 26 million pesos to 450 million pesos. He also increased resources on the ground for Indigenous groups by opening 58 more Indigenous Coordinating Centers (CCI), which were regional INI offices that acted as liaisons between the capital and Indigenous populations across the nation.

=== Plan Huicot ===
Early in his term, Echeverría initiated Plan Huicot to implement his promise of committing federal resources to the development of Indigenous communities. The plan was headed up by Echeverría's new director of the INI, Gonzalo Aguirre Beltrán, a Mexican anthropologist. Throughout these development programs, INI acted as a liaison between Indigenous communities and other federal agencies and as a distributor of the resources of those collaborating agencies. Plan Huicot was the first of many plans to address the economic issues Indigenous communities faced. Through Plan Huicot and the following initiatives the federal government invested $96.5 million pesos from 1971-1973.

In terms of economic development, the INI invested in Indigenous agricultural production with programs for providing equipment, environmental sustainability, providing professional assistance, as well as helping gain land titles and other legal services concerning land ownership. Under the Echeverría administration, the INI handled 838 land title cases which eventually benefited 243,500 Indigenous peoples. Echeverria also distributed 6.5 million hectares to Indigenous groups.

The INI also expanded medical services and patient capacity in the CCI's. Indigenous use of these services was limited at first because of mistrust of Western medicine and preference for traditional medicine and treatments. To break down this mistrust, the INI provided scholarships to Indigenous youth to train as medical personal and trained 88 doctors and 382 medical assistants by 1976.

Indigenous communities had mistrusted past Indigenista education programs when non-Indigenous professionals were sent in. To increase the effectiveness and Indigenous participation in public education, the INI replaced mestizo teachers with Indigenous ones. They also increased training of bilingual teachers and cultural promoters from 3500 in 1970 to 14,000 (8,000 cultural promoters and 6,000 teachers) in 1976. The role of cultural promoters was to relay the mission of the INI to Indigenous communities as a native Indigenous speaker. Both the teachers and promoters were trained by the SEP, but worked through the CCI's as part of an agency collaboration.

=== First National Congress of Indigenous People ===
In Pátzcuaro, Michoacán the First National Congress of Indigenous People was held from October 7–10, 1975. It was preceded by 58 regional conferences held at the Indigenous Coordinating Centers to discuss the problems local Indigenous communities were facing. From those regional conferences delegates were selected by the communities to represent them at the national conference. 56 delegations of about 15 delegates were present. There were over 2500 Indigenous people in attendance including delegates and general participants. The original agenda of the conference specifically included the discussion of land reform and the integration of marginalized ethnic groups as well as generally attaining Indigenous economic, social, and political rights. The governments hope was that the conference would give agency to Indigenous communities to create their own vision of progress.

The final demands of the Indigenous delegates to Echeverría included improved distribution of land and resources, improved infrastructure for travel and medical care, the nationalization of agricultural industries, access to credit, fair rates for artisan products, bilingual and bicultural education for all ages, and gender equality. In addition, there was call for Indigenous autonomy, self-determination, and federal recognition of Indigenous uses and customs. Indigenous leaders justified their demand for self-determination in claiming it was their given right from the Mexican Revolution. Enacting self-determination meant a voluntary incorporation by Indigenous peoples into national society as Mexican citizens

After the reading of the document, Echeverría assured the Congress of his administrations commitment to ending marginalization of the Indigenous populations and distributed resolutions giving 1 million hectares to 23,736 Indian families as well as certificates of recognition. The Congress gave Indigenous people a platform to voice their concerns and influence policy as well as prompt additional conferences to create a resurgence of Indigenous mobilization Echeverría's six-year presidential term ended in December 1976, so that his promises made this late in his presidency would have to be taken up by the next administration.

== Criticism ==
The Departamento de Asuntos Indígenas (DAI), established by Cárdenas in 1936, maintained the country for Indigenous people, and the intent of indigenista policies disinterested Mexicans generally. Government attempts to remake the image of Mexico's Indigenous were far from reality and many Mexicans saw that image as an ideological construct at odds with most urban Mexicans' perceptions of the Indigenous. According to historian Alexander Dawson, these government programs "were the products of a commitment on the part of the central state to prioritize the Indian as a national problem and national icon, but were never widely supported outside of fairly narrow circles" of indigenistas.

A number of urban Mexicans opposed to the government's indigenista projects began framing their opposition to them in terms of eugenics, attributing the situation of the Indigenous as due to heredity. A 1936 editorial in the Mexico City newspaper Excelcior stated "The Mendelian theory of inheritance serves as a basis of vigorously opposing the humanitarian work of the Government. The norms of the contemporary Indians have been passed from parents to their children as a sacred trust, and it is no simple task to remove these obstacles." Eugenics underpinned the Nazis' genocidal programs and after World War II would not be asserted as a scientific position.

One of the leftist critics of Indigenismo in Mexico was Mexican anthropologist Guillermo Bonfil Batalla (1935-1991). He helped organize the First National Congress of Indigenous Peoples and was a large proponent of Indigenous self-determination. Along with other Mexican anthropologists Bonfil Batalla criticized Indigenismo's attempt to "incorporate the Indian, that is, de-Indianize him" and trying to create a mestizo national identity. Instead, Bonfil Batalla called for a pluri-national state of co-existence where diverse cultural groups that can pursue their own goals free of impositions from Western culture. In January 1971, Bonfil Batalla and other anthropologists, including Darcy Ribiero and Stefano Varese, met in Barbados and released a Declaration that called for a redirection of the roles of the government, religious organizations, and anthropologists in their relationships with Indigenous groups. The redirection involved a respect for Indigenous culture and transferring power and authority over Indigenous community development to the Indigenous communities.

In his work Mexico Profundo, Bonfil Batalla rejects that Mexico is a mestizo country and claims the mestizo nation building projects like Indigenismo have created an "Imaginary Mexico" formed from the dominant groups from Mexico's colonial history. The real Mexico or "México Profundo" is made up of the large groups of individuals and communities who are still culturally tied to the Mesoamerican civilization. Bonfil Batalla describes how these two identities have been in conflict for the past 500 years of Mexican history as Mexico Profundo actively resists incorporation attempts by the imaginary Mexico. He claims that the nation will fall apart if it continues to ignore the Mexico Profundo and continue with mestizo nation building policies. The pluri-cultural state he proposes would tolerate Western or mestizo culture, as all cultures would be respected and free from oppression and would be structured in an equal way instead of in opposition to each other. For the creation of a pluri-cultural state is to give cultural control to local communities, including social organization and education and to give equal political participation to the Mexico Profundo.

== See also ==
- Indigenismo in the United States
- Indigenous peoples of Mexico
