= Chicano Movement =

Social and political movement combating racism in the United States

- Part of Chicanismo
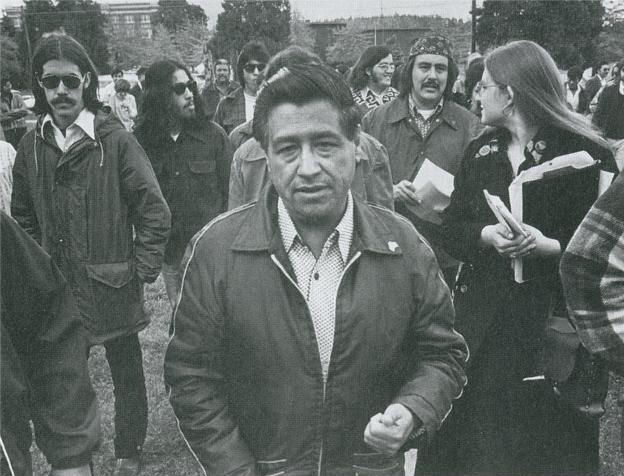
- Cesar Chavez with demonstrators
- Date: 1940s to 1970s
- Location: Western, Southwestern, and Midwestern United States
- Caused by: Racism in the United States, Zoot Suit Riots
- Goals: Civil and political rights
- Methods: Boycotts, Direct action, Draft evasion, Occupations, Protests, School walkouts
- Status: (continued activism by Chicano groups)

Parties
Chicano organizations: American GI Forum; Católicos por La Raza; Freedom Road Socialist Organization; MEChA; Mexican American Legal Defense and Educational Fund; Raza Unida Party; United Farm Workers; Chicano paramilitaries: Brown Berets; Chicano Liberation Front; Chicano gangs; Venceremos; Chicano subcultures: Pachucos; Cholos	Government of the United States: United States Department of Justice; Law enforcement in the United States

Lead figures
Cesar Chavez; Reies López Tijerina; Héctor P. García; Rodolfo "Corky" Gonzáles; José Ángel Gutiérrez; Dolores Huerta; Rosalio Muñoz	Government Leaders (President of the United States)

The Chicano Movement, also referred to as El Movimiento (pronounced [el moβiˈmjento], Spanish for "the Movement"), was a social and political movement in the United States that worked to embrace a Chicano identity and worldview that combated structural racism, encouraged cultural revitalization, and achieved community empowerment by rejecting assimilation. Chicanos expressed solidarity and defined their culture through the development of Chicano art during El Movimiento, and stood firm in preserving their religion.

The Chicano Movement was influenced by and entwined with the Black power movement, and both movements held similar objectives of community empowerment and liberation while also calling for Black–Brown unity. Leaders such as César Chávez, Reies Tijerina, and Rodolfo Gonzales learned strategies of resistance and worked with leaders of the Black Power movement. Chicano organizations like the Brown Berets and Mexican American Youth Organization (MAYO) were influenced by the political agenda of Black activist organizations such as the Black Panthers. Chicano political demonstrations, such as the East L.A. walkouts and the Chicano Moratorium, occurred in collaboration with Black students and activists. The Chicano Movement also crossed over with the Labor Movement using similar strategies and even overlapping goals with one another. César Chávez helped play an important role in both movements throughout their time.

Similar to the Black Power movement, the Chicano Movement experienced heavy state surveillance, infiltration, and repression from U.S. government informants and agent provocateurs through organized activities such as COINTELPRO. Movement leaders like Rosalio Muñoz were ousted from their positions of leadership by government agents, organizations such as MAYO and the Brown Berets were infiltrated, and political demonstrations such as the Chicano Moratorium became sites of police brutality, which led to the decline of the movement by the mid-1970s. Other reasons for the movement's decline include its centering of the masculine subject, which marginalized and excluded Chicanas, and a growing disinterest in Chicano nationalist constructs such as Aztlán.

== Etymology ==
Before this, Chicano/a had been a term of derision, adopted by some Pachucos as an expression of defiance to Anglo-American society. With the rise of Chicanismo, Chicano/a became a reclaimed term in the 1960s and 1970s, used to express political autonomy, ethnic and cultural solidarity, and pride in being of Indigenous descent (an ideology known as Indigenismo, which has roots in Mexican state-sponsored policies), diverging from the assimilationist Mexican-American identity.

== Origins ==
The Chicano Movement encompassed a broad list of issues—from restoration of land grants, to farm workers' rights, to enhanced education, to voting and political ethnic stereotypes of Mexicans in mass media and the American consciousness. In an article in The Journal of American History, Edward J. Escobar describes some of the negativity of the time:

The conflict between Chicanos and the LAPD thus helped Mexican Americans develop a new political consciousness that included a greater sense of ethnic solidarity, an acknowledgment of their subordinated status in American society, and a greater determination to act politically, and perhaps even violently, to end that subordination. While most people of Mexican descent still refused to call themselves Chicanos, many had come to adopt many of the principles intrinsic in the concept of chicanismo.

Early in the twentieth century, Mexican Americans formed organizations to protect themselves from discrimination. One of those organizations, the League of United Latin American Citizens, was formed in 1929 and remains active today. The movement gained momentum after World War II when groups such as the American G.I. Forum (AGIF), which was founded by returning Mexican American veteran Dr. Hector P. Garcia, joined in the efforts of other civil rights organizations. The AGIF first received national exposure when it took on the cause of Felix Longoria, a Mexican American serviceman who was denied a funeral service in his hometown of Three Rivers, Texas after being killed during WWII. After the Longoria incident, the AGIF quickly expanded throughout Texas, and by the 1950s, chapters were founded across the U.S.

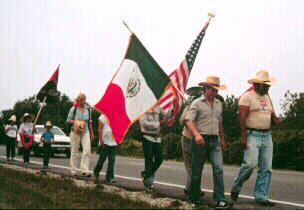
The Farm Labor Organizing Committee (FLOC)

Mexican American civil rights activists also achieved several major legal victories including the 1947 Mendez v. Westminster court case ruling which declared that segregating children of "Mexican and Latin descent" was unconstitutional, a ruling in 1974's Soria v. Oxnard which expanded on anti-segregation protections for Mexican-American students, and the 1954 Hernandez v. Texas ruling which declared that Mexican Americans and other historically subordinated groups in the United States were entitled to equal protection under the 14th Amendment of the U.S. Constitution.

Throughout the country, the Chicano Movement was defined by several different leaders. In New Mexico, there was Reies López Tijerina who worked on the land grant movement. He fought to regain control of what he considered ancestral lands. He became involved in civil rights causes within six years and also became a cosponsor of the Poor People's March on Washington in 1967. In Texas, war veteran Dr. Hector P. Garcia founded the American GI Forum and was later appointed to the United States Commission on Civil Rights. In Denver, Rodolfo "Corky" Gonzáles helped define the meaning of being a Chicano through his poem Yo Soy Joaquin (I am Joaquin). In California, César Chávez and the farm workers turned to the struggle of urban youth, and created political awareness and participated in La Raza Unida Party.

The most prominent civil rights organization in the Mexican-American community is the Mexican American Legal Defense and Educational Fund (MALDEF), founded in 1968. Although modeled after the NAACP Legal Defense and Educational Fund, MALDEF has also taken on many of the functions of other organizations, including political advocacy and training of local leaders.

Some women who worked for the Chicano movement felt that members were being too concerned with social issues that affected the Chicano community, instead of addressing problems that affected Chicana women specifically. This led Chicana women to form the Comisión Femenil Mexicana Nacional. In 1975, it became involved in the case Madrigal v. Quilligan, obtaining a moratorium on the compulsory sterilization of women and adoption of bilingual consent forms. These steps were necessary because many Latina women who did not understand English well were being sterilized in the United States at the time, without proper consent.

While the widespread immigration marches flourished throughout the U.S. in the Spring of 2006, the Chicano Movement continued to expand in its focus and its active participants. As of the 21st Century, a major focus of the Chicano Movement has been to increase the (intelligent) representation of Chicanos in mainstream American media and entertainment. There are also many community education projects to educate Latinos about their voice and power like South Texas Voter Registration Project. SVREP's mission is to empower Latinos and other minorities by increasing their participation in the American democratic process. Members of the beginning of the Chicano movement, like Faustino Erebia Jr., still speak about their trials and the changes they have seen over the years.

The movement started small in Colorado yet spread across the states becoming a worldwide movement for equality. While there are many poets who helped carry out the movement, Corky Gonzales was able to spread the Chicano issues worldwide through "The Plan Espiritual de Aztlán." This manifesto advocated Chicano nationalism and self-determination for Mexican Americans. In March 1969 it was adopted by the First National Chicano Youth Liberation Conference based in Colorado. Adolfo Ortega says, "In its core as well as its fringes, the Chicano Movement verged on strivings for economic, social, and political equality." This was a simple message that any ordinary person could relate to and want to strive for in their daily lives. Whether someone was talented or not they wanted to help spread the political message in their own way. While majority of the group consisted of Mexican-Americans many people of other nationalities wanted to help the movement. This help moved the movement from the fringes into the more mainstream political establishment. The "Political Establishment" typically consisted of the dominant group or elite that holds power or authority in a nation. Many successful organizations were formed, such as the Mexican American Youth Organization, to fight for civil rights of Mexican Americans.

During the early 1960s in Texas many Mexican-Americans were treated like second class citizens and discriminated against. While progress has been made for equality, immigrants even to this day are still a target of misunderstanding and fear. Chicano Poetry was a safe way for political messages to spread without fear of being targeted for by speaking out. Politically, the movement was also broken off into sections like chicanismo. "Chicanismo meant to some Chicanos dignity, self respect, pride, uniqueness, and a feeling of a cultural rebirth." Mexican-Americans wanted to embrace the color of their skin instead of it being something to be ashamed of. Many Mexican-Americans unfortunately had it ingrained on them through society that it was better socially and economically to act "White" or "Normal." The movement wanted to break that mindset and embrace who they were and be loud and proud of it. A lot of people in the movement thought it was acceptable to speak Spanish to one another and not be ashamed of not being fluent in English. The movement encouraged to not only discuss tradition with other Mexican-Americans but others not within the movement. America was a land of immigrants not just for the social and economically accepted people. The movement made it a point not to exclude others of other cultures but to bring them into the fold to make everyone understanding of one another. While America was new for many people of Latin descent it was important to celebrate what made them who they were as a culture. Entertainment was powerful tool to spread their political message inside and out of their social circles in America. Chicanismo might not be discussed frequently in the mainstream media but the main points of the movement are: self-respect, pride, and cultural rebirth.

This is a list of the major epicenters of the Chicano Movement.

- Albuquerque
- Chicago
- Corpus Christi
- Dallas
- Delano
- Denver
- El Paso
- Fresno
- Houston
- Las Vegas
- Los Angeles
- Oakland
- Phoenix
- San Antonio
- San Diego
- San Jose
- Santa Barbara
- San Francisco
- Sacramento

== Methods ==
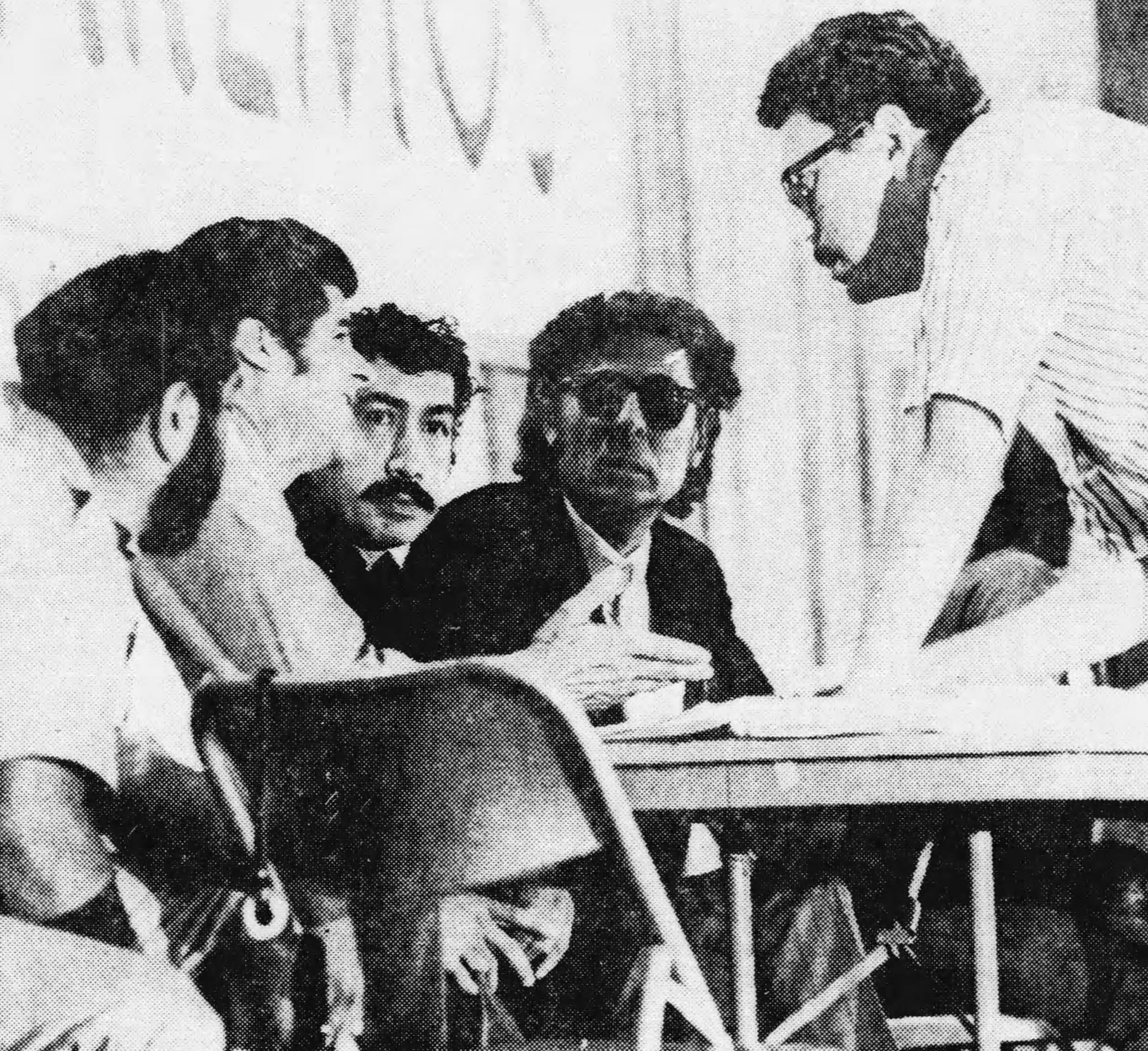
Three of the "Big Four" of the Chicano movement at the Raza Unida Party's 1972 convention: Reies Lopez Tijerina, New Mexico (second from left), Rodolfo "Corky" Gonzales, Colorado (center), and José Ángel Gutiérrez, Texas (far right). Cesar Chavez, California, did not attend.

The Chicano Movement employed a variety of tactics to achieve its political and social goals, many of which mirrored those of the Civil Rights and Labor Movements. Both movements relied on collective action to drive change. Key strategies of the Chicano Movement included protests, political engagement, legal action, and alliances with like-minded groups.

One major tactic was labor strikes, similar to those used in the labor movement, which aimed to withdraw labor and prompt economic boycotts in response. Nonviolent protests, demonstrations, and walkouts were also instrumental in drawing public attention to discrimination in schools and farms like those of the Los Angeles area during the 50s and 60s. Chicano students and workers frequently used these methods to challenge unfair treatment.

The Chicano movement used many different tactics but one main thing they did to actually mobilize the movement was use police violence as a way to have more community support and participation, the repression from the police created a strong ethnic identity among the communities which helped with expanding the movement.

Legal and political efforts played a crucial role in securing Chicano rights. Litigation was used to challenge discriminatory laws and expand legal protections. One major case was Hernandez v. Texas which gave Chicanos there first civil rights. The formation of organizations like La Raza Unida Party helped increase Chicano political representation and voter influence. Many Chicanos were unable to vote until the Voting Rights Act was amended to include language minorities in 1975, such as Spanish speakers.

The Chicano Movement also formed alliances with other civil rights organizations to strengthen its cause. One notable partnership was with Martin Luther King Jr.'s Poor People's Campaign. These coalitions helped broaden the movement’s reach and amplify its impact.

== Chicanas ==
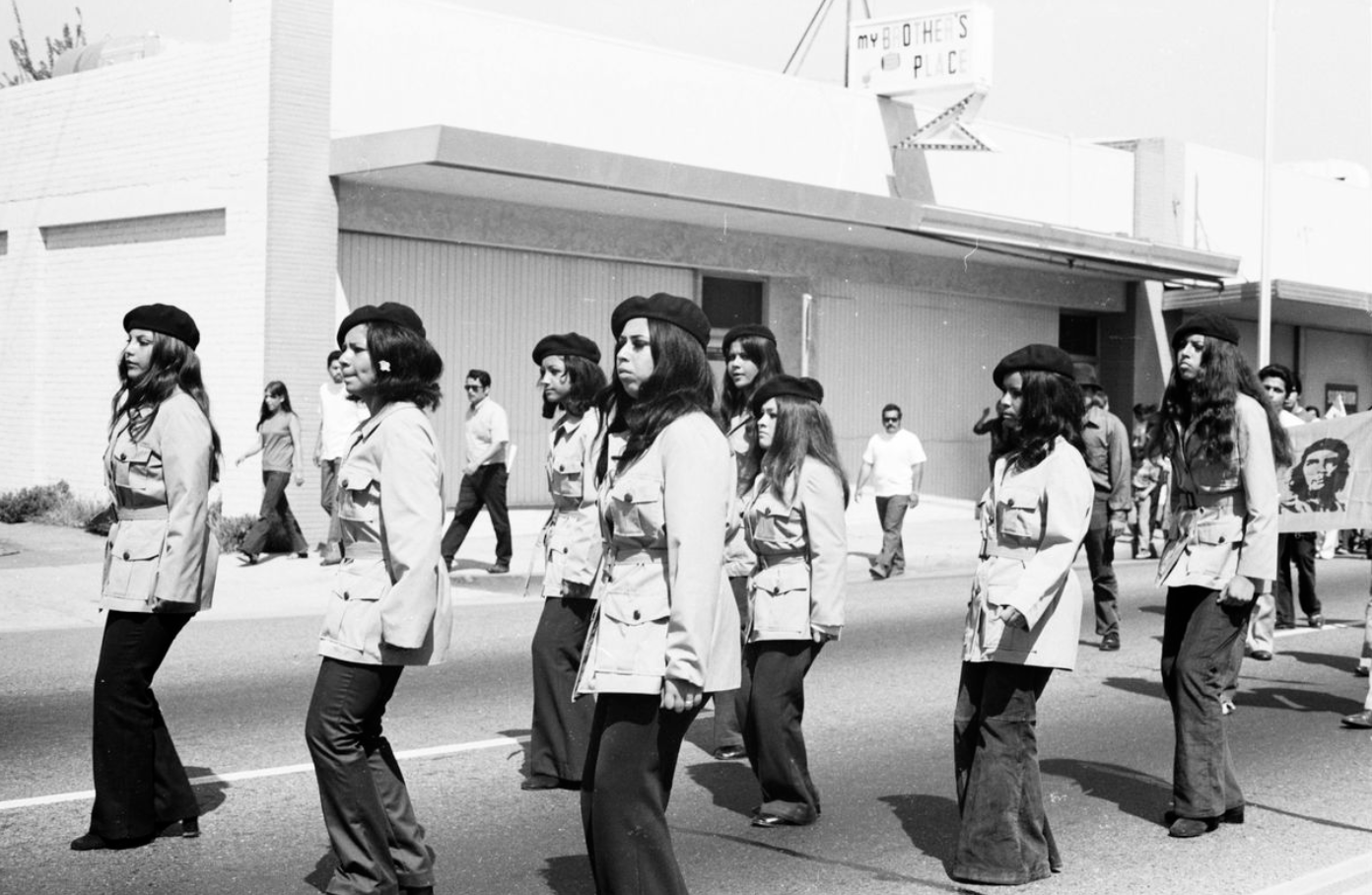
The Brown Berets marching in 1970.

While Chicanas are typically not covered as heavily in literature about the Chicano movement, Chicana feminists have begun to re-write the history of women in the movement. Chicanas who were actively involved within the movement have come to realize that their intersecting identities of being both Chicanas and women were more complex than their male counterparts. Through the involvement of various movements, the main goal of these Chicanas was to include their intersecting identities within these movements, specifically choosing to add women's issues, racial issues, and LGBTQ issues within movements that ignored such identities. One of the biggest women's issues that the Chicanas faced was that Mexican men drew their masculinity from forcing traditional female roles on women and expecting women to bear as many children as they could. While women were active in all aspects of the Chicano Movement, Chicana activists also confronted gender inequality within the movement. Chicana feminists, such as those involved in the Comisión Femenil Mexicana Nacional, challenged both racism and sexism, advocating for reproductive rights, educational opportunities, and labor protections. Prominent Chicana activists included Dolores Huerta, Elizabeth "Betita" Martínez, Anna Nieto-Gómez, Alicia Escalante, and Enriqueta Vasquez, who played major roles in broadening the movement’s agenda to address gender, race, and class oppression.

Sociologist Teresa Cordova, when discussing Chicana feminism, has stated that Chicanas change the discourse of the Chicano movement that disregard them, as well as oppose the hegemonic feminism that neglects race and class. Through the Chicano movement, Chicanas felt that the movement was not addressing certain issues that women faced under a patriarchal society, specifically addressing material conditions. Within the feminist discourse, Chicanas wanted to bring awareness to the forced sterilization many Mexican women faced during the 1970s. The film No Mas Bebes describes the stories of many of these women who were sterilized without consent. Although Chicanas have contributed significantly to the movement, Chicana feminists have been targeted; they are targeted because they are seen as betraying the movement and being anti-family and anti-men. By creating a platform that was inclusive to various intersectional identities, Chicana theorists who identified as lesbian and heterosexual were in solidarity of both. With their navigation through patriarchal structures, and their intersecting identities, Chicana feminists brought issues such as political economy, imperialism, and class identities to the forefront of the movement's discourses. Enriqueta Longeaux and Vasquez discussed in the Third World Women's Conference, "There is a need for world unity of all peoples suffering exploitation and colonial oppression here in the U.S., the most wealthy, powerful, expansionist country in the world, to identify ourselves as third world peoples in order to end this economic and political expansion."

In particular, the 1968 East Los Angeles School Blowouts, a pivotal moment in student activism, saw young Chicanas playing central roles in organizing protests and advocating for educational reform. Oral histories reveal that women not only participated in demonstrations but also served as strategic planners and community leaders, challenging both racial discrimination and gendered expectations within the movement itself.

Many chicanas supported tons of national labor struggles, such as the United Farm Workers grape boycott, these women had organized picket lines and refused to purchase grapes that were anti-union. They distributed flyers with information regarding strikes and continued to spread the movement through this.

Chicanas fought on many fronts for social justice. They confronted institutionalized racism, organized delegations of hundreds of parents and students to ask for accountability from school administrators who had been accused of being racially abusive. Sofia Mendoza, a chicana who had been working for the chicano movement, had gone to Roosevelt Jr. Highschool to advocate against these administrator. She employed tactics such as walkouts, public assemblies and picketing to attack the discrimination in education and increased community participation alongside it.

== Central Americans ==
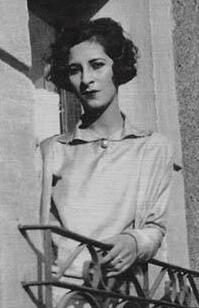
Luisa Moreno, a Guatemalan social activist who played a major role in the pre-Chicano Movement.

The Chicano Movement was not only limited to Mexican-American individuals. Central Americans also participated in the movement, often identifying themselves as Chicano. In the 1960s, the Central American population comprised approximately 50,000 across the United States. In California, Central Americans migrated and concentrated in cities like San Jose, San Francisco, and Los Angeles. Similar to Mexican Americans, Central Americans faced issues in the United States such as discrimination, lack of access to education and healthcare, and low-wage jobs. The difference is that Central American activists have called for the inclusion of Central American issues and experiences within the broader movement. The Central American diaspora has faced discrimination and mistreatment in the United States, particularly from other Latinos because of their identity.

The effects of the Chicano Movement are still felt by Central Americans in the modern times. For instance, many of the MEChA chapters that were established during the movement have started to rename the organization. The Los Angeles Times reported on leaders in the Garfield High School chapter deciding to avoid mentioning the word "Chicano" or "Aztlán," since they explained that the names were Mexican-centric and excluded identities.

In academia, there is a movement to expand Chicano-Latino departments to include Central American Studies. Cal-State Northridge became the first university to establish a Central American Studies Department in the United States. In 2019, students at University of California, Los Angeles organized for their Chicana/o Studies Department to expand and include Central American Studies. Most recently, East Los Angeles College added a Central American Studies major, being the first community college to do so. South American departments and majors have to be realized.

== Geography ==
Scholars have paid some attention to the geography of the movement and situate the Southwest as the epicenter of the struggle. However, in examining the struggle's activism, maps allow us to see that activity was not spread evenly through the region and that certain organizations and types of activism were limited to particular geographies. For instance, in southern Texas where Mexican Americans comprised a significant portion of the population and had a history of electoral participation, the Raza Unida Party started in 1970 by Jose Angel Gutierrez hoped to win elections and mobilize the voting power of Chicanos. RUP thus became the focus of considerable Chicano activism in Texas in the early 1970s.

The movement in California took a different shape, less concerned about elections. Chicanos in Los Angeles formed alliances with other oppressed people who identified with the Third World Left and were committed to toppling U.S. imperialism and fighting racism. The Brown Berets, with links to the Black Panther Party, was one manifestation of the multiracial context in Los Angeles. The Chicano Moratorium antiwar protests of 1970 and 1971 also reflected the vibrant collaboration between African Americans, Japanese Americans, American Indians, and white antiwar activists that had developed in Southern California.

Chicano student activism also followed particular geographies. MEChA established in Santa Barbara, California, in 1969, united many university and college Mexican American groups under one umbrella organization. MEChA became a multi-state organization, but an examination of the year-by-year expansion shows a continued concentration in California. The Mapping American Social Movements digital project shows maps and charts demonstrating that as the organization added dozens then hundreds of chapters, the vast majority were in California. This should cause scholars to ask what conditions made the state unique, and why Chicano students in other states were less interested in organizing MEChA chapters.

== Political activism ==
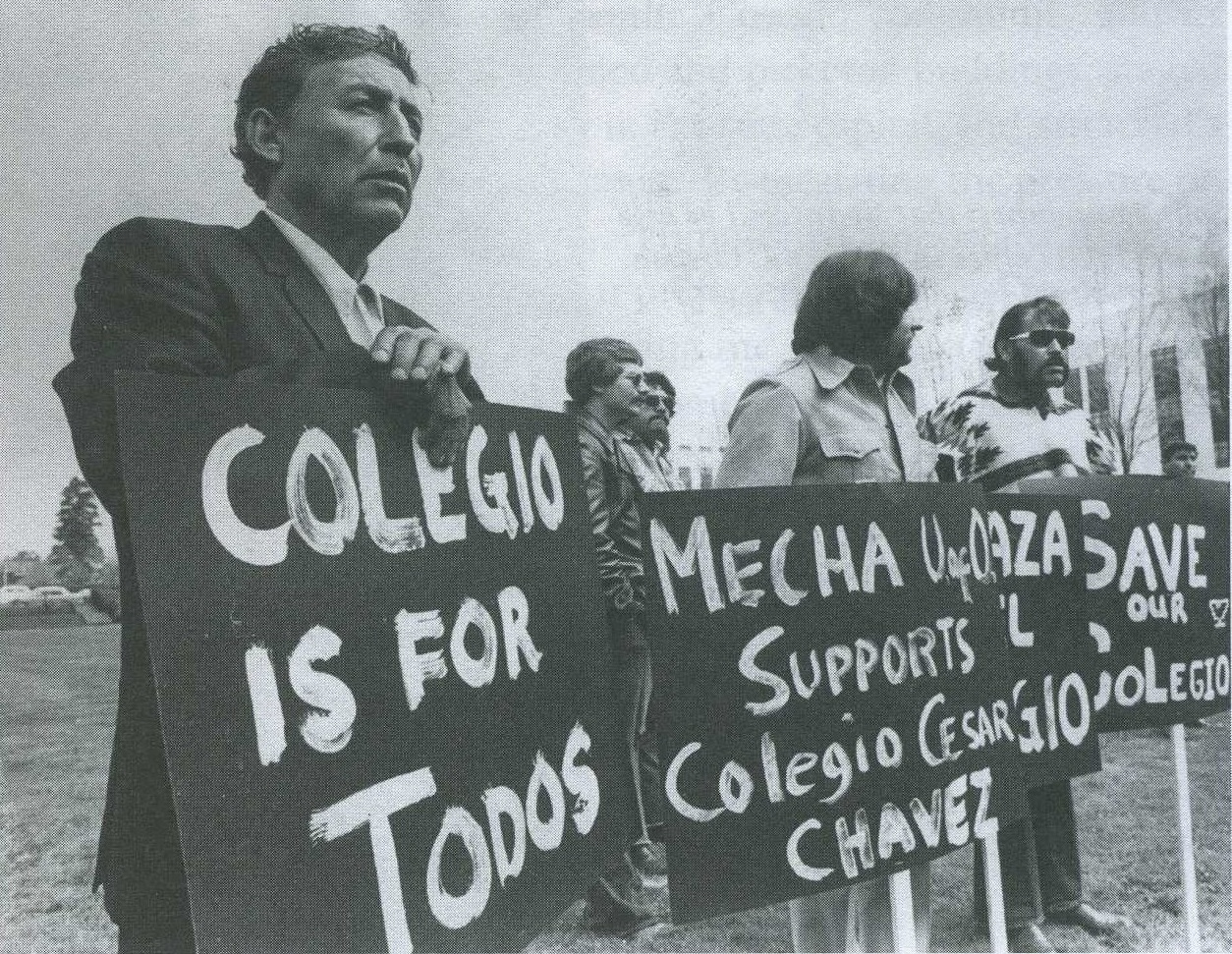
Members of MEChA protesting for free college tuition at the Colegio César Chávez in Mt. Angel, Oregon.

In 1949 and 1950, the American G.I. Forum initiated local "pay your poll tax" drives to register Mexican American voters. Although they were unable to repeal the poll tax, their efforts did bring in new Latino voters who would begin to elect Latino representatives to the Texas House of Representatives and to Congress during the late 1950s and early 1960s.

In California, a similar phenomenon took place. When World War II veteran Edward R. Roybal ran for a seat on the Los Angeles City Council, community activists established the Community Service Organization (CSO). The CSO was effective in registering 15,000 new voters in Latino neighborhoods. With this newfound support, Roybal was able to win the 1949 election race against the incumbent councilman and became the first Mexican American since 1886 to win a seat on the Los Angeles City Council.

The Mexican American Political Association (MAPA), founded in Fresno, California, came into being in 1959 and drew up a plan for direct electoral politics. MAPA soon became the primary political voice for the Mexican-American community of California.

The late 1960s and early 1970s witnessed a growing engagement with leftist political thought among Chicano activists. Groups such as the Centro de Acción Social Autónomo (CASA) embraced Marxist principles and sought to address labor exploitation alongside racial injustice. This ideological shift contributed to a broader understanding of oppression, linking the Chicano struggle with global anti-colonial and socialist movements.

== Student and youth organizations ==
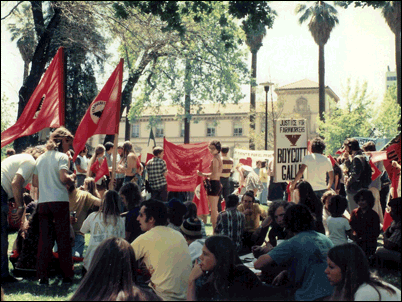
Student protest in support of the UFW boycott, San Jose, California.

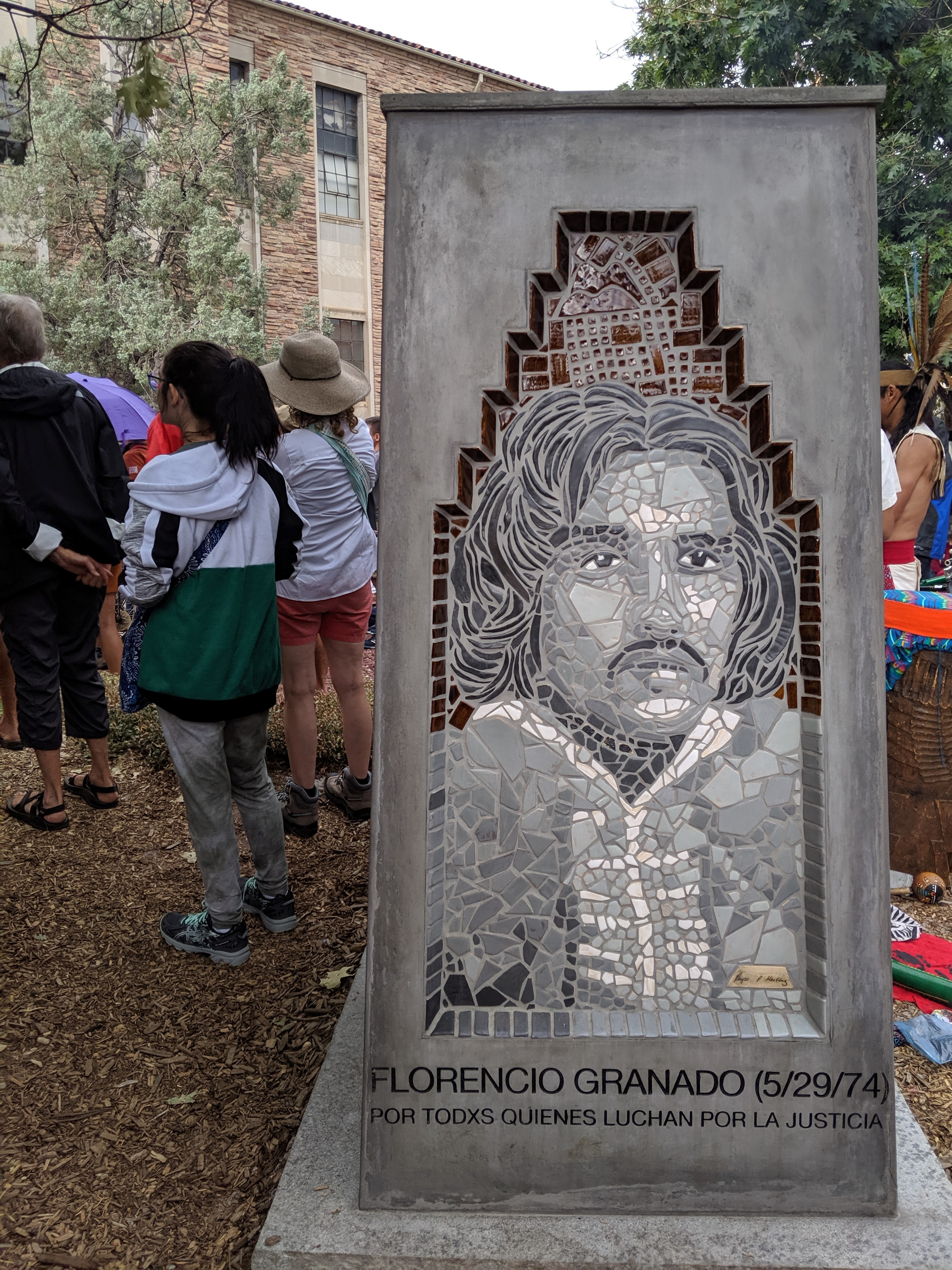
Detail of the "Los Seis de Boulder" memorial sculpture on the University of Colorado Boulder campus

Chicano student groups such as the United Mexican American Students (UMAS), the Mexican American Youth Association (MAYA) in California, and the Mexican American Youth Organization in Texas, developed in universities and colleges in the mid-1960s. South Texas had a local chapter of MAYO that also made significant changes to the racial tension in this area at the time. Members included Faustino Erebia Jr, local politician and activist, who has been a keynote speaker at Texas A&M University at the annual Cesar Chavez walk. At the historic meeting at the University of California, Santa Barbara in April 1969, the diverse student organizations came together under the new name Movimiento Estudiantil Chicano de Aztlán (MECHA). Between 1969 and 1971, MECHA grew rapidly in California with major centers of activism on campuses in southern California, and a few chapters were created along the East coast at Ivy League Schools. By 2012, MECHA had more than 500 chapters throughout the U.S. Student groups such as these were initially concerned with education issues, but their activities evolved to participation in political campaigns and to various forms of protest against broader issues such as police brutality and the U.S. war in Southeast Asia. The Brown Berets, a youth group which began in California, took on a more militant and nationalistic ideology. Youth organizations played a crucial role in shaping the political strategies of the Chicano Movement. Groups such as the Brown Berets and Movimiento Estudiantil Chicano de Aztlán (MEChA) were at the forefront of advocating for educational reforms, organizing student walkouts, and challenging racial discrimination in schools.

The UMAS movement garnered great attention in Boulder, Colorado after a car bombing killed several UMAS students. In 1972, UMAS students at the University of Colorado Boulder were protesting the university's attitude towards UMAS issues and demands. Over the next two years hostilities had increased and many students were concerned about the leadership of the UMAS and Chicano movements on the CU Boulder Campus. On May 27, 1974, Reyes Martinez, an attorney from Alamosa, Colorado, Martinez's girlfriend, Una Jaakola, CU Boulder alumna University of Colorado Boulder, and Neva Romero, an UMAS student attending CU Boulder, were killed in a car bombing at Boulder's Chautauqua Park. Two days later another car bomb exploded in the Burger King parking lot at 1728 28th St. in Boulder, killing Francisco Dougherty, 20, Florencio Grenado, 31, and Heriberto Teran, 24, and seriously injuring Antonio Alcantar. It was later determined both explosions were caused by homemade bombs composed of up to nine dynamite sticks. Most of the victims were involved in the UMAS movement in Boulder, Colorado. They came to be known as Los Seis de Boulder. Many students in the UMAS and Chicano movement believed the bombing was directly correlated to the students' demands and rising attention on the Chicano movement. An arrest was never made in connection with the car bombing.

A University of Colorado Boulder Master of Fine Arts student, Jasmine Baetz, created an art exhibit in 2019 dedicated to Los Seis de Boulder. The art exhibit is a seven-foot-tall rectangular sculpture that includes six mosaic tile portraits. The depiction of each activist faces the direction in which he or she died. It currently sits in front of the TB-1 building east of Macky Auditorium on the CU-Boulder campus. Baetz, a Canadian, had by chance seen the film Symbols of Resistance, a documentary about Los Seis de Boulder, in 2017. She became inspired to create a piece of art to honor the activists. She invited community participation in the project; over 200 people worked on it in some capacity. The base of the sculpture states, “Dedicated in 2019 to Los Seis de Boulder & Chicana and Chicano students who occupied TB-1 in 1974 & everyone who fights for equity in education at CU Boulder & the original stewards of this land who were forcibly removed & all who remain.” It also states, “Por Todxs Quienes Luchan Por La Justicia” (for all those who fight for justice). CU students have protested a campus decision not to make the art exhibit permanent. CU announced the exhibit would be made permanent in September 2020.

A memorial in honor of Los Seis de Boulder was installed at Chautauqua Park in Boulder on May 27, 2020, at the location of the first car bomb explosion exactly 46 years ago. The City of Boulder provided a $5000 grant for the memorial which the Colorado Chautauqua Association's Buildings and Grounds Committee and the City of Boulder Landmarks Review Committee approved. Family members of the deceased gathered to watch as the stone monument was put in place.

== Student walkouts ==
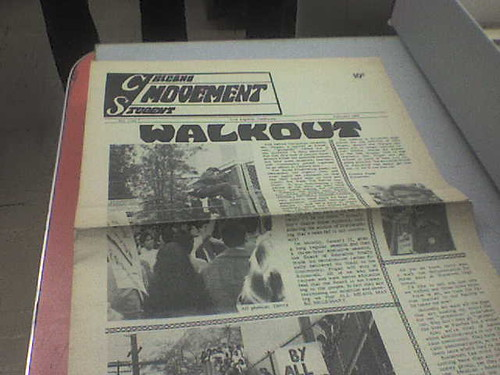
Chicano Student Movement Walkout February, 1969.

After World War II, Chicanos began to assert their views of their history and status as Mexican Americans in the US and they began to critically analyze what they were being taught in public schools. Many young people, like David Sanchez and Vickie Castro, founders of the Brown Berets protested the injustices they saw. In the late 1960s, when the student movement was active around the globe, the Chicano Movement inspired its own organized protests such as the East L.A. walkouts in 1968, and the National Chicano Moratorium March in Los Angeles in 1970. The student walkouts was started in the LA County high schools of El Monte, Alhambra, and Covina (particularly Northview), the students marched to fight for their rights. These LA walkouts prompted other major student walk outs that occurred in San Francisco, Denver, Houston, and other major cities. While there was movements happening in these major cities, there was an uproar of walkouts taking place that grew lots of attention in the Southwest, specifically within Texas between 1968 and 1970. In this region, many students were Mexican Americans whom staged walkouts in places like San Antonio, Kingsville, and other surrounding cities. The students protested about the inadequate conditions of their schools such as poor facilities and lack of learning resources. In addition, many of the students demand that they would not be penalized for using Spanish in school.

These LA walkouts prompted other major student walk outs that occurred in San Francisco, Denver, Houston, and other major cities. While there was movements happening in these major cities, there was an uproar of walkouts taking place that grew lots of attention in the Southwest, specifically within Texas between 1968 and 1970. In this region, many students were Mexican Americans whom staged walkouts in places like San Antonio, Kingsville, and other surrounding cities. The students protested about the inadequate conditions of their schools such as poor facilities and lack of learning resources. In addition, many of the students demand that they would not be penalized for using Spanish in school.

== Anti-war activism ==
The Chicano Moratorium was a movement by Chicano activists that organized anti-Vietnam War demonstrations and activities throughout the Southwest and other Mexican American communities from November 1969 through August 1971. The movement focused on the disproportionately high death rate of Mexican American soldiers in Vietnam as well as the discrimination faced at home. After months of demonstrations and conferences, it was decided to hold a National Chicano Moratorium demonstration against the war on August 29, 1970. The march began at Belvedere Park in LA and headed towards Laguna Park alongside 20,000 to 30,000 people. The Committee members included Rosalio Muñoz and Corky Gonzales and only lasted one more year, but the political momentum generated by the Moratorium led many of its activists to continue their activism in other groups. The rally became violent when there was a disturbance in Laguna Park. There were people of all ages at the rally because it was intended to be a peaceful event. The sheriffs who were there later claimed that they were responding to an incident at a nearby liquor store that involved Chicanos who had allegedly stolen some drinks. The sheriffs also added that upon their arrival they were hit with cans and stones. Once the sheriff arrived, they claimed the rally to be an "unlawful assembly" which turned violent. Tear gas and mace were everywhere, demonstrators were hit by billy clubs and arrested as well. The event that took place was being referred to as a riot, some have gone as far to call it a "Police Riot" to emphasize that the police were the ones who initiated it.

The LA Protest brought many chicanos together and got support from other areas like Denver, Colorado who brought one hundred members and affiliates. On August 29, 1970, this was the largest rebellious movement of minorities since Watts uprising of (1965). More than 150 people were arrested and four were killed some accidental. A report from the Los Angeles Times stated, Gustav Montag got in direct contact with the police when they began opening fire in an alley and Gustav's defense was to throw broken pieces of concrete at the officers. The article stated the police officers were aiming over his head in attempts to scare him off. Montag was pictured being carried away from the scene by several brothers and was later announced dead at the scene. Montag was a Sephardic Jew who supported the movement.

== Law Enforcement and the Chicano Movement ==
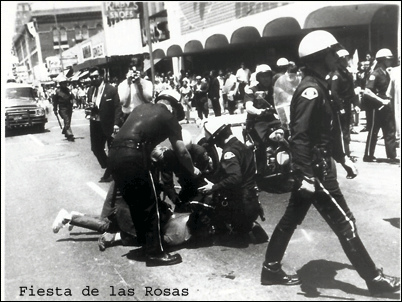
Police subduing Chicano Movement rioters in San Jose, California.

Edward J. Escobar details in his work the relationship between various movements and demonstrations within the Chicano Movement and the Los Angeles Police Department between the years 1968–1971. His main argument explores how "police violence, rather than subduing Chicano movement activism, propelled that activism to a new level -- a level that created a greater police problem than had originally existed".

=== Major Incidents of Conflict ===
==== National Chicano Moratorium (1970) ====
The National Chicano Moratorium that was held on August 29, 1970 was demonstration as part of the Anti-war (Vietnam War) protest. Over 20,000 people gathered and marched through East Los Angeles, which was one of the largest anti-war demonstrations organized by Mexican Americans in the United States. The demonstration started off as a peaceful protest, however tension escalated after law enforcement entered Laguna Park using tear gas and other crowd control tactics that triggered a widespread disorder.

As a result, hundreds of protestors were arrested and injured, as well as three fatalities. One of those killed was a popular Los Angeles Times journalist, Ruben Salazar, whom was killed by police after they shot a tear-gas projectile into the Silver Dollar Café where he was after covering the moratorium demonstration and succeeding riots. In honor of his death, Laguna Park was later renamed as Rubén F. Salazar Park.

The protest and Salazar's death was an example of what Escobar presents as inspiration of political consciousness in an even broader base of Mexican-Americans, where many considering him a "martyr". Other historians covered his life's story. Though one person in particular Mario T. García, whom is a historian, author, and professor written extensively about Salazar. García later edited a collected volume of Salazar's work to publish the book "Border Correspondent: Selected Writings, 1955-1970 (Latinos in American Society and Culture)." Through his publication, García documented Salazar's career and highlighted his significance as a leading Mexican-American journalist during the period. García also notes that the circumstances around Salazar's death became an important historical event in understanding the Chicano Movement and its legacy.

==== East Los Angeles Walkouts (1968) ====
In March 1968, thousands of American-American high school students in East Los Angeles staged coordinated walkouts from schools including Wilson High School, Garfield High School, Lincoln High School, and Roosevelt High School. Students protested about the physical conditions of their schools such as overcrowded classrooms and the outdated textbooks. In addition, students protested about the curriculum itself because there was a lack of college preparatory courses and the exclusion of Mexican American history. The students and other activist formed a group called the Educational Issues Coordinating Committee (EICC). The EICC presented a list of demands to the Los Angeles Board of Education but were unable to secure immediate reforms due to budget constraints.

==== Police Surveillance and Infiltration ====
Edward J. Escobar claims the Chicano Movement and its sub-organizations were infiltrated by local law enforcement and the Federal Bureau of Investigation (FBI) to acquire information and cause destabilization from within the organizations. Methods used by law enforcement included "red-baiting, harassment and arrest of activists, infiltration and disruption of movement organizations, and violence." Agent provocateurs were oftentimes planted in these organizations to disrupt and destabilize the movements from within. Repression from law enforcement broadened Chicano political consciousness, their identities in relation to the larger society, and encouraged them to focus their efforts on politics.

=== Influence of Other Movements ===
Relations between Chicano activists and the police mirrored those with other movements during this time. As Escobar states, Black Civil Rights activists in the 50's and 60's "set the stage by focusing public attention on the issue of racial discrimination and legitimizing public protest as a way to combat discrimination." Marginalized communities began using this public platform to speak against injustices they had been experiencing for centuries at the hands of the U.S. government, perpetuated by police departments and other institutions of power. Like many of the movements during this time, Chicanos took inspiration from the Black Panther Party and used their race, historically manipulated to disenfranchise them, as a source of cultural nationalism and pride..

=== Broader Latino and Central American Involvement ===
There are also cases involving Central American activists and the police that sparked activism within the greater Chicano Movement. One case is that of Los Siete de la Raza and their altercation with two policemen in San Francisco's Mission District in 1969.

== Chicano art ==
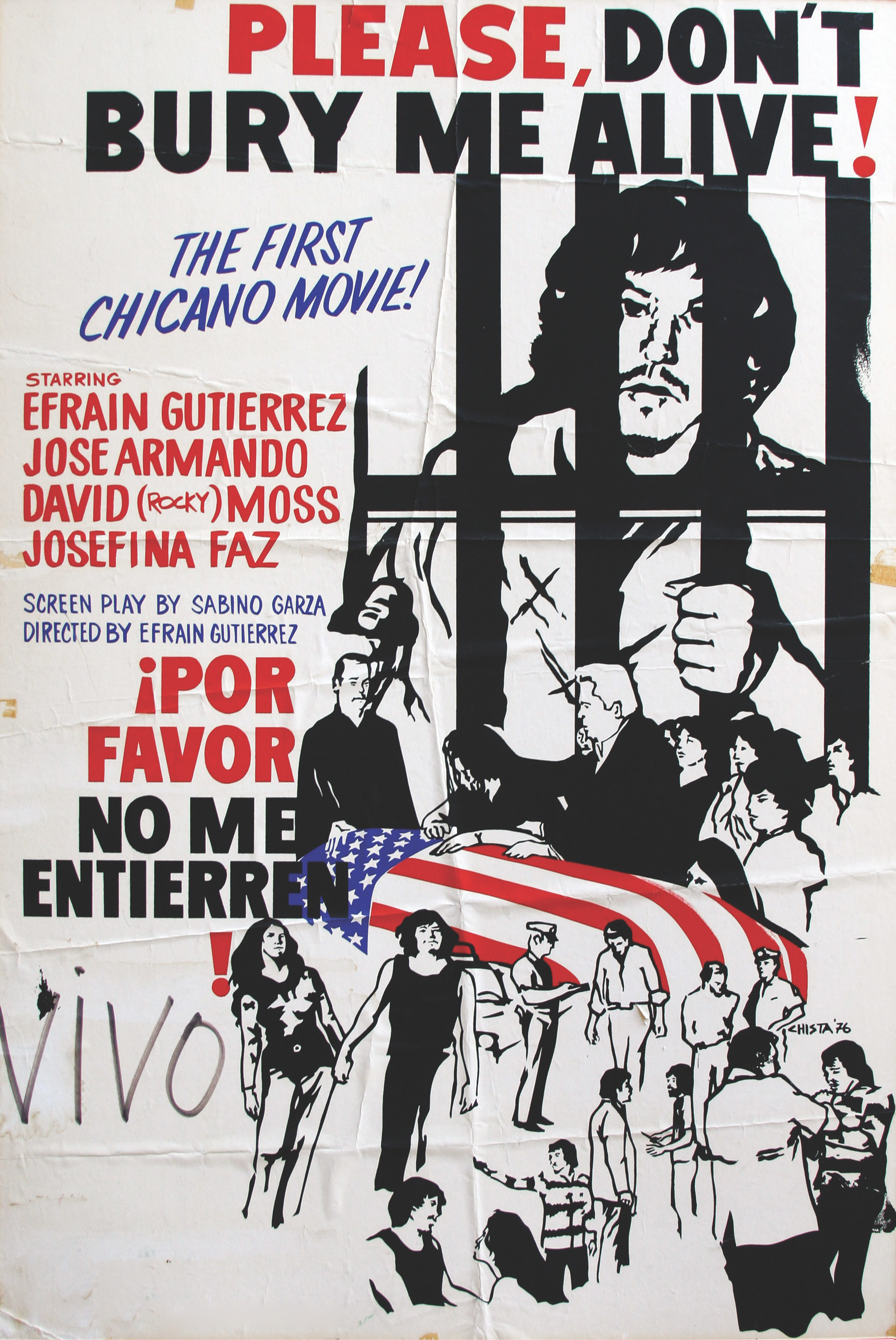
"Please, Don't Bury Me Alive!"

Art of the Movement was the burgeoning of Chicano art fueled by heightened political activism and energized cultural pride. Chicano visual art, music, literature, dance, theater and other forms of expression have flourished. During the 20th century, an emergence of Chicano expression developed into a full-scale Chicano Art Movement. Chicanos developed a wealth of cultural expression through such media as painting, drawing, sculpture and printmaking. Similarly, novels, poetry, short stories, essays and plays have flowed from the pens of contemporary Chicano writers.

Operating within the Chicano art movement is the concept “rasquachismo,” which comes from the Spanish term “rasquache.” This term is used to describe something that is of lower quality or status and is often correlated with groups in a society that fit this description and have to become resourceful to get by. Chicano artists being resourceful can be seen when artists cut up tin cans and flatten them out into rectangles to use as canvases. In addition to its influence in the visual arts, the concept “rasquachismo” informs Chicano performing arts. El Teatro Campesino's La Carpa de los Rasquachis is a play written by Luis Valdez in 1972, which tells the story of a farmworker that has migrated to the United States from Mexico; this play teaches the audience to look for ways to be resourceful.

Chicano Art developed around the 1960s during the Chicano Liberation Movement. In its beginning stages, Chicano art was distinguished by the expression through public art forms. Many artists saw the need for self-representation because the media was trying to suppress their voices. Chicano artists during this time used visual arts, such as posters and murals in the streets, as a form of communication to spread the word of political events affecting Chicano culture; UFW strikes, student walkouts, and anti-war rallies were a few of the main topics depicted in such art. Artists like Andrew Zermeño reused certain symbols recognizable from Mexican culture, such as skeletons and the Virgen de Guadalupe, in their own art to create a sense of solidarity between other oppressed groups in the United States and globally. In 1972, the group ASCO, founded by Gronk, Willie Herrón, and Patssi Valdez, created conceptual art forms to engage in Chicano social protests; the group utilized the streets of California to display their bodies as murals to draw attention from different audiences.

Chicano artists created a bi-cultural style that included US and Mexican influences. The Mexican style can be found by their use of bright colors and expressionism. The art has a very powerful regionalist factor that influences its work. Examples of Chicano muralism can be found in California at the historic Estrada Courts Housing Projects in Boyle Heights. Another example is La Marcha Por La Humanidad, which is housed at the University of Houston.

Chicano performing arts also began developing in the 1960s with the creation of bilingual Chicano theater, playwriting, comedy, and dance. Recreating Mexican performances and staying in line with the “rasquachismo” concept, Chicanos performed skits about inequalities faced by people within their culture on the back of trucks. The group ASCO also participated in the performing art form by having “guerrilla” performances in the streets. This art form spread to the spoken word in 1992 when a collection of Chicana spoken word was recorded on compact disc. Chicano comedians have also been publicly known since the 1980s, and in 1995, the first televised Chicano comedy series was produced by Culture Clash. Photography was another form of art that aided in the Chicano Movement's progress.

About 20 years after the Chicano Movement, Chicano artists were affected by political priorities and societal values, and they were also becoming more accepted by society. They were becoming more interested making pieces for the museums and such, which caused Chicano art to become more commercialized, and less concerned with political protest.

Chicano art has continued to expand and adapt since the Chicano Movement. Today the Millennial Chicano generation has begun to redefine the Chicano art space with modernized forms of self-expression, although some artists still try to preserve the traditional Chicano art forms. As the community of Chicano artists expands and diversifies, Chicano art can no longer fit under just one aesthetic. The younger generation takes advantage of technology to create art and draws inspiration from other cultural art forms, such as Japanese anime and hip hop. Chicano art is now defined by the experimentation of self-expression, rather than producing art for social protests.

== Chicano press ==
The Chicano press disseminated Chicano history, literature, and current news. The press created a link between the core and the periphery to create a national Chicano identity and community. The Chicano Press Association (CPA) created in 1969 was significant to the development of this national ethos. The CPA argued that an active press was foundational to the liberation of Chicano people, and represented about twenty newspapers, mostly in California but also throughout the Southwest.

Chicanos at many colleges campuses also created their own student newspapers, but many ceased publication within a year or two, or merged with other larger publications. Organizations such as the Brown Berets and MECHA also established their own independent newspapers. Chicano communities published newspapers like El Grito del Norte from Denver and Caracol from San Antonio, Texas.

Over 300 newspapers and periodicals in both large and small communities have been linked to the Movement.

== Chicano religion ==
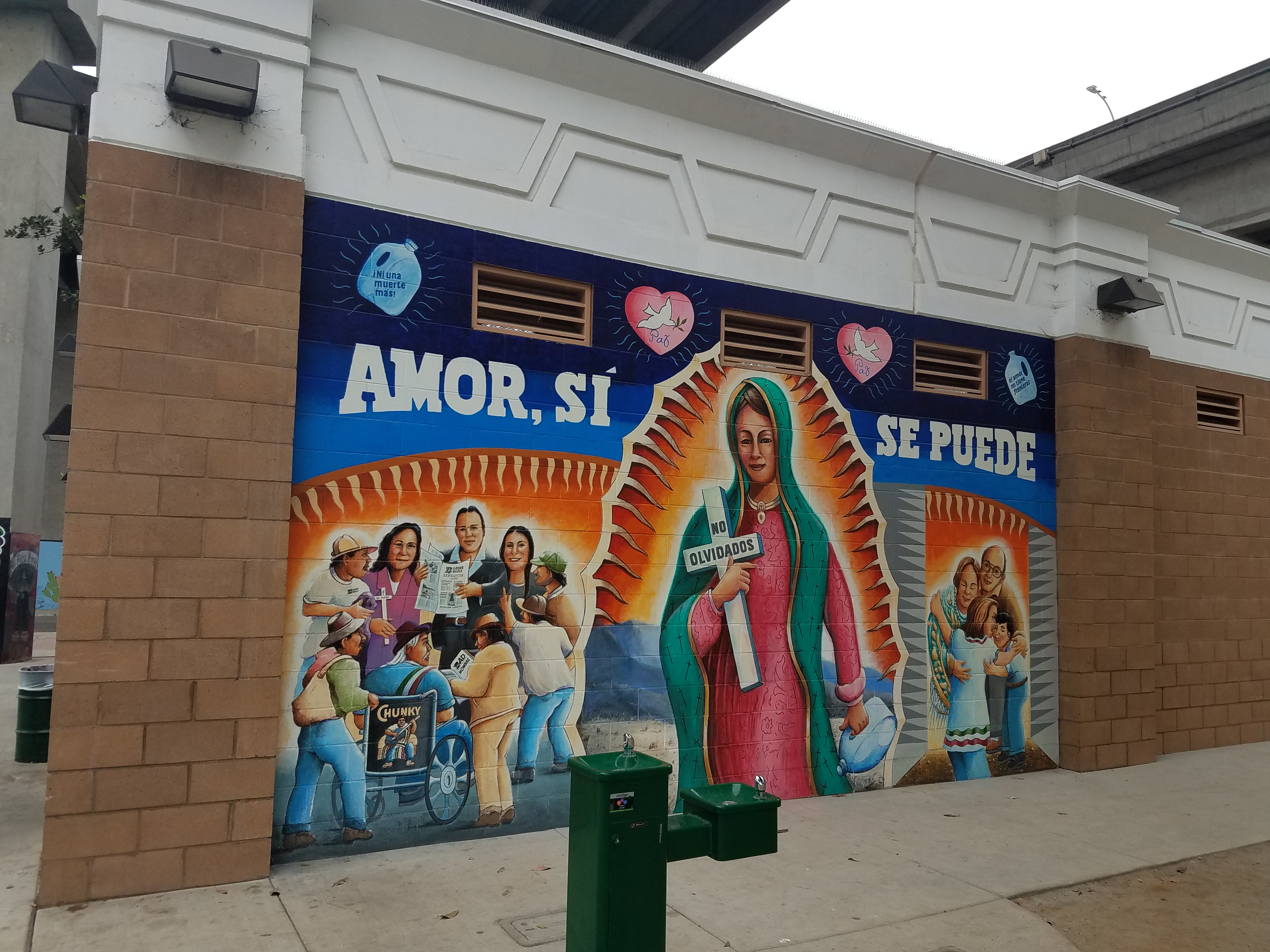
La Virgen de Guadalupe, mural in Chicano Park, San Diego

The Chicano Movement was generally aligned with Marxist views of religion and viewed religion as an opium of the people. However, a notable minority were Catholics and cited Catholic social teaching as a foundation of their political and social beliefs. The movement held various, often contradictory positions on the role of the Catholic Church in the Chicano community.

Religious participants in the Chicano Movement did not separate their religion from their political activism. Many in the Chicano Movement were influenced by their Catholic identities. Cesar Chávez heavily relied on Catholic influence and practices. Fasting was a common practice of many activists, who would break their fasts only to receive the Eucharist. Our Lady of Guadalupe was a symbol of inspiration during many protests.

Católicos por La Raza (Note: (lit. 'Catholics for The Race')) (CPLR) was a notable group concerned with religious reform founded in 1969 by Catholic Chicano student activists. They aimed to influence the ecclesial hierarchy to direct funds and efforts to support the movement and the Chicano community of Los Angeles through public protests. A series of protests centered on the costly newly-constructed St. Basil Catholic Church in Los Angeles, where protesters disrupted a Christmas Eve Midnight Mass and burned their baptism certificates. CPLR cited the cleansing of the Temple as their motivation for protesting, as they believed that members of the Chicano community were being exploited by ecclesial authorities. These protests reflected a broader demand for accountability and community empowerment in faith-based activism.

Folk Catholicism, which combined Catholic and Indigenous religious practices, was also observed by some members of the movement. Altars would be set up by the matriarchs of families that often included both Catholic symbols and Indigenous religious symbols. Both Catholic beliefs and Indigenous religious practices influenced many in the Chicano Movement.

== Aztlán: Identity and Geography ==
=== Background ===
The concept of Aztlán as the place of origin of the pre-Columbian Mexican civilization became a symbol for various Mexican nationalist and Indigenous movements. Aztlán was used as a form of identity, and to describe geographical land.

=== Identity ===
Shortly after the Mexican-American War, “the Treaty of Guadalupe Hidalgo granted remaining Mexicans rights to property, religion, culture, and education,” however, the U.S government did not “honor or enforce” these rights. The failure to honor and ensure rights under the Treaty of Guadalupe Hidalgo would ignite the Chicano Movement. The children of the remaining Mexicans attended school to become Americanized. The treatment of Mexican descendants would inspire poets like Alurista to join the Chicano Movement. One of the most notable quotes from Alurista is “expel the Yankee from our hearts." Sentiments like Alurista's can be attributed to the integration of Aztlán as a new Identity to reject Americanization.

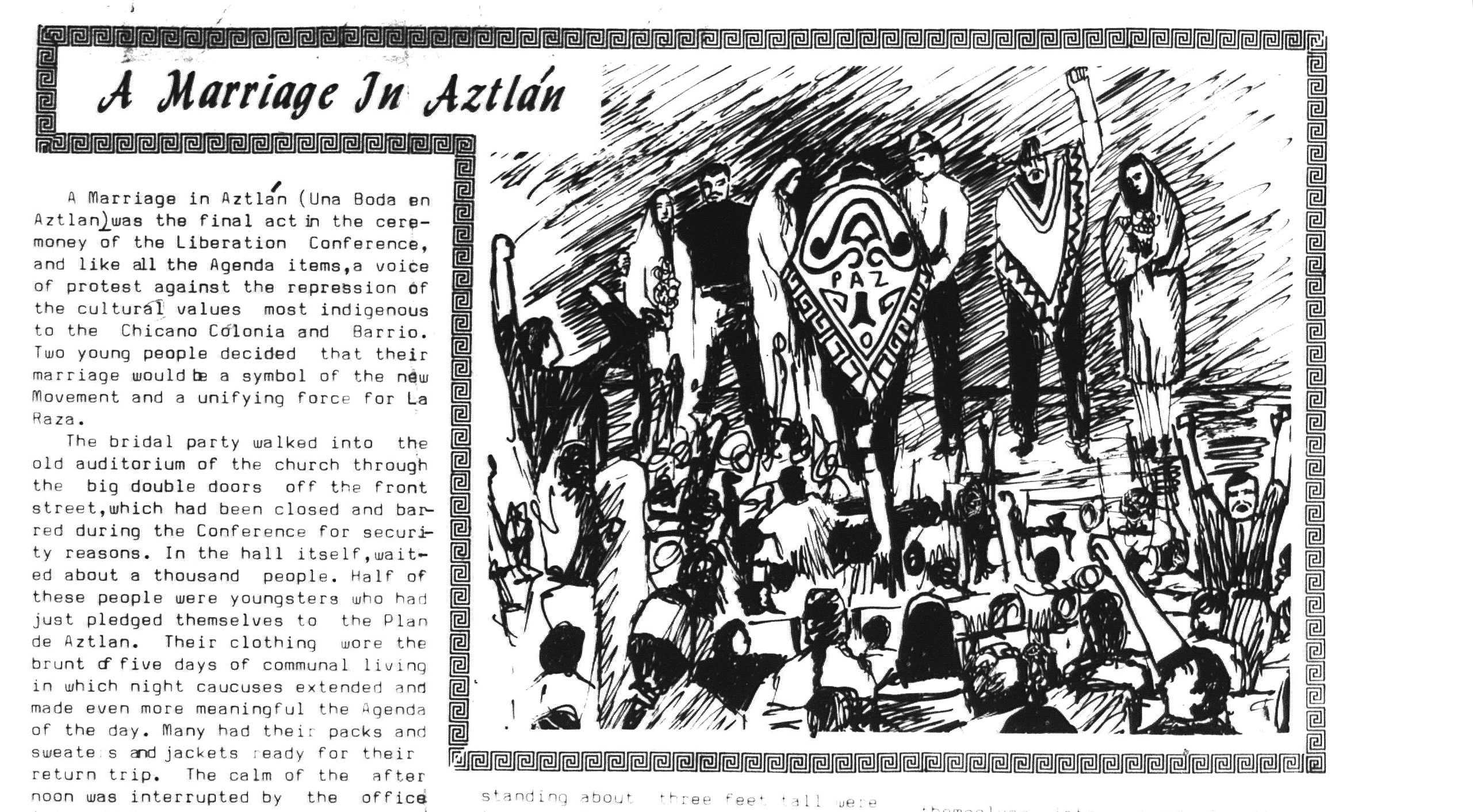
Activists reproducing a marriage in Aztlán at the Chicano Youth Liberation Conference

=== Geography ===
The name Aztlán was first taken up by a group of Chicano independence activists led by Oscar Zeta Acosta during the Chicano movement of the 1960s and 1970s. They used the name "Aztlán" to refer to the lands of Northern Mexico that were annexed by the United States as a result of the Mexican–American War. Combined with the claim of some historical linguists and anthropologists that the original homeland of the Aztecan peoples was located in the southwestern United States even though these lands were historically the homeland of many American Indian tribes (e.g. Navajo, Hopi, Apache, Comanche, Shoshone, Mojave, Zuni and many others). Aztlán in this sense became a "symbol" for mestizo activists who believed they have a legal and primordial right to the land. Some scholars argue that Aztlan was located within Mexico proper. Groups who have used the name "Aztlán" in this manner include Plan Espiritual de Aztlán, MEChA (Movimiento Estudiantil Chicano de Aztlán, "Chicano Student Movement of Aztlán").

Many in the Chicano Movement attribute poet Alurista for popularizing the term Aztlán in a poem presented during the Chicano Youth Liberation Conference in Denver, Colorado, March 1969.

== See also ==
- Adela Sloss Vento – American writer (1901–1998)
- Chicano – Ethnic identity of some Mexican Americans
- Chicanismo – Ideology of the Chicano movement
- Chicano nationalism – Nationalist ideology of Chicanos
- Chicano studies – Scholarly field
- Chicano/a Movement in Washington State History Project – Project at the University of Washington
- Chicano literature – Aspect of Mexican-American literature
- El Chicano – 2018 American film by Ben Hernandez Bray
- Indigenismo in the United States – Latin American political ideology in the United States
- Latina lesbian organizations in the United States - List of organizations that were formed out of the intersectionality of lesbian identifying Latina's in the United States
- Mario Cantu
- Mexican American Civil Rights Institute
