= Oxnard Klan Riot of 1978 =

Riot in Oxnard, California

On the afternoon of July 30, 1978, in Oxnard, California, the Ku Klux Klan attempted to show The Birth of a Nation at the municipal community center as a recruiting and fundraising drive. The event was disrupted by a combative protest led by the Progressive Labor Party and Committee Against Racism. The demonstrators outnumbered the Klan and Oxnard Police and Ventura County Sheriffs, who protected the event from the demonstrators. A fight and subsequent hours-long protest ensued between the Klan and Police who faced the demonstrators. After some hours, the police broke up the demonstration.

== Background ==
Oxnard was, until around the 1970s, a majority-white suburb, with the demographics shifting towards becoming a majority-Latino city. The Klan had a historically weak presence in Ventura County, being stronger in the Los Angeles area, particularly in Inglewood and Anaheim. While for much of its history the city was majority white, by 1963, Oxnard schools were becoming "majority-minority." In the 1970s, segregation became a divisive issue in the city, particularly in the context of schools. After the 1971 Soria v. Oxnard School District Board of Trustees verdict challenged the de facto segregation, with the verdict declaring the Oxnard Elementary School District had a responsibility to have "a racially balanced elementary school system." A fight over busing students and school district segregation came to a head, but this did not lead to the Klan's rise in Oxnard as it did in towns like Pontiac, Michigan, at around the same time. Regardless, racial tensions rose, as was the case in many LA area suburbs during integration.

Recent history in the county demonstrated that members of the predominantly working-class communities in Ventura County were willing to use militancy. In the decades prior to the event, working-class Mexican immigrants and Chicanos across Ventura County also participated in strikes, riots, and rebellions. The major instances were in La Colonia in 1971, as well as again in 1974, and in nearby Santa Paula twice in the same year. People fought against police departments for the heavy-handed patrolling of neighborhoods, police brutality, and curfews enforced in neighborhoods like La Colonia, which were enforced in full riot police formations. Also in the county, a circuit of activists formed around organizations like the Community Service Organization (CSO), UFW, both known for their leadership by Cesar Chavez in Oxnard, the NAACP, and the Brown Berets, and several unions. Additionally, a base of activists formed around campuses in the county, particularly with organizations like MEChA and Black Student Union.

In 1977, racial tensions would escalate to their highest before the riot due to a rape and murder case, in which three Latino residents of Oxnard murdered Paul Yenney Jr. and raped and assaulted Linda Fiene, both a high-school couple. In July 1978, the Klan organizers successfully applied for a permit for an event that would be led by Tom Metzger, the Klan's second most famous leader at the time. The Klansmen chose to show The Birth of a Nation, the seminal Klan propaganda piece that outlines much of their central ideology, and was additionally used to stage recruiting rallies as far back as the 1920s. The Progressive Labor Party (PLP), along with their sub-organization Committee Against Racism (CAR), were allowed to protest the event by the City government, as part of the organization's campaign against fascists and racist organizations.

== Skirmish and protests ==
In the early afternoon, a crowd of hundreds of PLP/CAR counter-protesters gathered outside of the community center where the Klan would be screening The Birth of a Nation. According to police on the ground, the crowd of counter-protesters was described as "mostly Mexican-Americans" as well as there being a more moderate NAACP-led crowd.

At approximately 1:30 in the afternoon, the Klansmen charged into the community center. It was at this point where they were met by PLP and CAR demonstrators. The demonstrators used various weapons such as "dirt-clods, sticks, unopened soda-pop cans, and steel pipes wrapped in newspaper". Demonstrators and the Klansmen were "forcibly separated" by the Oxnard policemen by the doors and at the windows outside of the community center, much of which had sustained surface damage (broken windows). While the police were not fully collaborating the Klan, their initial mission of peacekeeping meant protecting the Klan's event. At this time, the demonstrators combatted the police using the aforementioned mentioned tactics, and police on the scene were "outnumbered 150-200 to 9". Many of the demonstrators, while in combat, were chanting "Death to the Klan, kill the Klan, kill the Klan and the Klan cops; we have done it before and we'll do it again".

After the scene of combat, the more militant demonstrators returned to the original protest and a "seemingly peaceful" protest continued until about 3:15. Around this time, an effigy of a Klansman was burned at the demonstration, and by 3:42, the Oxnard Police declared the protest as an unlawful assembly. Police ordered the protesters to disperse six times (in English and Spanish) but to no avail. Protestors jeered at the police in response, to the cheering enthusiasm of the residents, many of whom congregated on 9th St.

At 4:00, fifty Oxnard Police and the Ventura County Sheriffs broke up the demonstration and several of the demonstrators were arrested.

== Aftermath ==
At the initial reporting of the event, an estimated fifteen people suffered serious injuries, and thirteen people were arrested. One of the activists served a short sentence after being charged on the basis of inciting a riot, and participation in unlawful assembly.

The events in Oxnard did not lead to mass sympathy for the Klan in Oxnard. No "Klavern" (town or city Klan chapter) was ever formed in the city. What occurred in Oxnard was one of several incidences of violence that occurred in California and throughout the country in the late 1970s, and preluded intensified violence and the increasing association of the Klan movement with openly Nazi elements. In Castro Valley just two months later, the Klan battled with the PLP and CAR at an event, also led by Metzger, against Vietnamese refugees who had settled in the town. By 1979, the Klan ramped up their violence at the Greensboro Massacre, wherein the Klan murdered five members of the Communist Workers Party, and again in 1980 in Oceanside California, when Klansmen brutally assaulted counter-demonstrators.
