= Alberto Antonio Peña Jr. =

American civil rights activist (1917–2006)

Alberto Antonio Peña Jr. (December 15, 1917 – July 3, 2006) was an American civil rights activist. Originally from San Antonio, Texas, Peña sought to improve the treatment of Mexican-Americans in his local community. With his schooling in law, Peña fought several school districts on their segregation policies which won him popularity within civil rights circles. He served four terms as Bexar County Commissioner from 1956 to 1972. He was well known not only in the Mexican American community but also the African-American community and often aided the NAACP in their goals as well.

== Personal life ==
=== Early life ===
Alberto Antonio Peña Jr. was born in San Antonio, Texas, on December 15, 1917, to parents Alberto and Dolores Peña. Alberto Jr. first attended St. Mary's Catholic School, but as he was the oldest of eight children, his father could not afford the tuition. Alberto Jr. then attended Stephen F. Austin Elementary. Once his primary schooling was completed, he continued on to Hawthorne Junior High School. Throughout his early schooling, teachers and classmates had shortened Alberto's name to the nickname "Albert", which he would be known by for the majority of his life. Albert grew up in a very traditional home, where his sisters would do most of the housework while he focused on schoolwork and recreational activities.

=== Military service ===
Peña Jr. joined the Navy soon after the attack on Pearl Harbor and began as a radioman during World War II. Peña was at first hesitant to join the Navy due to his commitment to his then pregnant girlfriend Joséfina "Josie" Herrera, whom he married quietly before he was shipped out to San Diego. While Albert Jr. was fighting the war, his first son, Albert Anthony Peña, was born on November 23, 1942. As Albert Peña Jr. was coming home from the war, his daughter Belinda Peña was born on July 31, 1944. In 1947 Peña Jr. divorced his first wife, Joséfina Herrera. Peña Jr. remarried not long after his divorce from Joséfina.

=== Higher education ===
He married Olga Ramos in September 1947, who was a part of a mutual friend's wedding. Peña's Jr.'s Father, Albert Sr., pushed Albert Jr. to continue with his education and to become a lawyer like himself, going so far as paying his child support so he could focus on school. Olga also pressured Peña Jr. to become an attorney and even included it as a requirement before he could ask for her hand in marriage. After his time in the military, Albert Peña attended St. Mary's University, but he later dropped out of St. Mary's with discrimination playing a key factor in that decision. After deciding to pursue his law degree, Peña went on to study at the South Texas College of Law in Houston. His schooling was paid for through the G.I. Bill. Peña graduated in 1950 and became involved in politics around the same time.

=== Family ===
As Peña Jr. was finishing his law degree, Albert and Olga's first child together, William Albert Peña, was born. After William "Bill" Peña, Olga had four girls with Albert Jr.: Sandra Francis, Mary Magdalena, Olga, and Roxanne Peña. Peña passed the bar on August 20, 1951, and could legally start practicing law with his license. After 25 years of marriage, Albert and Olga divorced in 1972. Albert had an on and off again marriage with Rosa "Rosie" Hernandez that lasted for more than ten years. During their marriage, Rosie gave birth to their daughter Christina Peña. After Albert and Rosie divorced for the last time, he married Frances Guajardo. They remained married until his death in 2006. After years of suffering from Parkinson's disease, Albert Peña Jr. died in 2006 from natural causes at the age of 88.

== Political career ==
Peña was first introduced to politics in 1948 by Eddie Ball, another law student at South Texas College of Law. When Peña returned to San Antonio in 1951, he became an attorney and worked with his father and brother under the law firm, Peña, Peña, and Peña. While at first hesitant to return to his home town and become involved in political affairs, Peña's wife Olga strongly encouraged him to help his community. Olga Peña herself participated in many events to help her husband and often offered him her support. After Peña's wife pushed him to help his community, Peña joined the American G.I. Forum (A.G.I.F.).

=== First integration school case ===
In 1951, Hector P. Garcia, the leader and founder of the A.G.I.F., asked Peña to evaluate the conditions of Hondo Independent School District to determine if their policies were discriminatory. Peña discovered that the district had essentially separated the Anglos and Méxicanos in different schools based on the children's ability to read English. While the district denied separating students on the basis of ethnicity, Peña appealed the case to the Texas Board of Education. The state school board did not decide if the school policy was constitutional or not. Due to pressure from Hispanic parents, Peña was forced to use another method to achieve the change he desired. His strategy was for Méxicano parents to attempt to register their children in the Anglo school repeatedly until the effort attracted press attention, specifically the San Antonio paper. When the state school board in Austin heard of this, they ordered the school to integrate.

=== Second integration school case ===
After gaining recognition from the Hondo integration case, the League of United Latin American Citizens (LULAC) asked Peña to investigate a similar situation in Lytle, Texas. The school district there had also separated the Anglo and Méxicano students. In this particular town, the conditions for the Mexican students were significantly poorer than what the white students received. Beyond just learning conditions, Mexican students were discriminated against by being forced to learn from teachers that only spoke English. Peña again spoke to the Lytle School Board and used the superintendent as his star witness, who had previously admitted to the segregation between the Anglo and Chicano students. Peña's strategy of applying pressure directly to the school board rather than taking legal action once again worked and the school board then desegregated the school.

=== Political campaigns ===
Peña sought public office but often experienced defeat, even when running alongside white liberal candidates. He dealt with discrimination within his own party. In predominantly white sectors of Texas, Anglos did not support Chicanos running for office, therefore liberal groups did not see a future in supporting a Chicano candidate. Peña ran for the state legislature in 1952 and 1954 but lost both times. In 1956, he ran for Bexar County Commissioner and with his wife Olga's connections with the community, he was elected the first Mexicano commissioner for that county. After he held elected office, Peña had better means to support his family while simultaneously being able to help the Mexicano community. After serving four consecutive terms, Peña lost his reelection bid in 1972. Olga continued to manage Albert's campaigns until their divorce in 1972.

=== Links to the African American community ===
==== NAACP ====
Because the African-American community shared similar interests as the Mexican American community, Peña and other leaders supported each other and shared a mutually beneficial relationship. After coming back from the war, Peña Jr. befriended the black community and discovered the many ways in which both communities faced segregation. In December 1957 Peña was elected to the board of the local National Association for the Advancement of Colored People (NAACP) branch and in the following spring he became the chair.

==== Harvey Case ====
Albert had established previous relationships with the black community and their leaders such as Claude Black. Due to this relationship, many Civil Rights leaders sought his advice and counsel for legal matters. "Sporty" Harvey was an up-and-coming African American boxer referred to Albert Peña Jr. by local black leaders after having been denied a mixed match by the state labor commissioner. Mixed matches were those between members of different races. Harvey thought he could gain the title of boxing champion in his weight classification but the denial of mixed matches proved to be a barrier for him and his sought-after title.

Peña brought the case to court and argued that Harvey's rights were being violated because he was not allowed to fight against a white opponent due to his race. The judge hearing the case ruled in favor of the state labor commissioner saying that boxing was not a fundamental right, and thus the Fourteenth amendment did not offer any protection in this case. Peña sought the help of Carlos Cadena and Maury Maverick Jr. in appealing the case. On appeal, Harvey won his case and was allowed to fight against white opponents. In 1955, he became the first African American boxer to fight a white opponent in Texas.
