= La Marcha Por La Humanidad =

Mural at the University of Houston, Texas, U.S.

La Marcha Por La Humanidad, also known as the Chicano Mural, is a mural housed at the University Center on the campus of the University of Houston. In 1973 artist Mario Gonzales and Ruben Reyna painted the mural. Both Mario Gonzales and Ruben Reyna were Vietnam veterans and UH students. Funding for the mural was obtained from the university's chapter of the Mexican American Youth Organization. The mural depicts the political angst of the Chicano Movement, featuring Uncle Sam with a skull in place of a head, an effect popular in twentieth-century Mexican and Chicano art. It is twelve by fifty five feet in height and length.

== Subjects ==
"The left side of the mural features images of Aztecs, farmers (campesinos) and images of Mexico's history and fore fathers. Painted by Reyna are, Sor Juana Ines de la Cruz, Father Miguel Hidalgo, Benito Juarez, Emiliano Zapata, Pancho Villa, President Lazaro Cardenas and the power of the Catholic Church. Representing the women's active role and participation in the Mexican revolutions, one sees "La Adelita" holding the Mexican flag, as she leads an army of campesinos forward in this struggle. On the far left, Reyna painted the Aztecs being tortured at the stake, as a representation of the Spaniard's conquest of their wealth and lands. On the right side of the mural, Gonzales painted images of historical figures of the 60s and 70s—Cesar Chavez, Alicia Escalante, Reies Lopez Tijerina, and a sea of people demanding change," explains a KUHF article. The article continues with an explanation by Ruben Reyna. "I painted the left section of the mural and Mario painted the right and we met in the middle, which is the future of the Chicano,' Reyna said. 'We painted the past, the history of Mexico, our beginnings from the days of the Spaniard conquest of the Aztecas. We brought it to the far right (of the mural) and identified some key figures of the Chicano movement.'" In one portion of the mural, lady justice is depicted holding an unbalanced scale, defining the inequality of justice in America. However, the central portion of the mural is perhaps the most iconographic. Gonzales states that the young man in the middle of the mural has reached the step stones of educational success, where he is confronted by his conscience, which is "Moctezuma, Moteuczomatzin Ilhuicamina" and all the history of his ancestors. He is also embraced by his government, which is depicted as the skeletal figure in Uncle Sam garb. The young man is faced with a choice of what to make of his life, his education and accomplishments. Will he think of just himself or help make a change in Humanity. In conclusion, the theme is for all humans regardless of race or color, should attempt to change the world to create a more unified and humane society. An invitation is extended to all the students, who are the force that can make a change in the world. They are encouraged to: "Don’t forget their roots, work for the well being and for the prosperity of not just the Hispanics but of the entire world."

== 1995 Threat ==
In 1995 the University Center Policy Board proposed the removal of the mural, as part of an effort to change the theme of the University Center. Hispanic Student Association President Russell Contreras spearheaded efforts to encourage Chicano students to attend a policy board meeting in favor of preserving the mural. He mentions that these were not the first efforts to have the mural removed. A coalition of students wrote a letter to the editor of the campus newspaper, the Daily Cougar. Many administrators were in favor of moving the mural, which is painted on a scroll and attached to the wall. In the end, student protests prevailed and the mural was not moved.

== 2012 Threat and resolution ==
In December 2011, while a major renovation to the University Center was about to begin, the University of Houston refused to give written assurances to activists and alumna indicating that the mural would be preserved and displayed in the remodeled University Center. Instead, the university offered the possibility of digitizing an image of the piece. Contributing to alumna and student concerns was that the year before several murals had been whitewashed at TSU, a university about one mile away. Protests, press conferences and petitions were quickly organized.

In January 2012 the University of Houston formally agreed to preserve the mural and to prominently feature the mural in the University Center's new building design. Diana Gutierrez, a student at the university, did a great deal of campus organizing on behalf of the mural. She did an interview with Mi Casa Broadcasting, explaining her thoughts. Professor Lorenzo Cano, Associate Dean for the Center for Mexican American Studies, was involved in the original efforts to have the mural painted. In at least one interview, he spoke about the murals significance, commenting that when he was enrolled, the Chicano community was not represented very well.

After the university had committed to preserving the mural, the university Art Acquisition Committee took over the management of the preservation. Soon after, Mr. Gonzales requested permission to paint an addition to the lower section of the mural, representing the protests and efforts to save the mural and the miracle that the mural was preserved entitled "En Los Manos de Dios", translated "In the Hands of God". Mr Gonzales was opposed by fellow artist, Ruben Reyna, who was against any changes being made to the originality of the mural and was supported by Mr. Lorenzo Cano and Tatcho Mindiola, the Director of the Center for Mexican American Studies at UofH. The University System-wide Art Acquisition Committee (SWAAC) denied, artist Gonzales' request to add this addition to the mural. The System-wide Art Acquisition Committee is now in charge of caring for the mural. On January 28, 2014 the University of Houston unveiled the restored piece, which is now on display in the Barnes & Noble student bookstore, located in the University Center.

== Significance beyond university ==
The Chicano Mural movement has been recognized internationally as a significant cultural contribution. The Texas State Historical Commission mentions that the Chicano Mural Movement of the 1960s and 70's helped to affirm cultural identity and to challenge racism. The association's website chronicles many murals which were removed or painted over due to controversial themes. Many fell into poor conditions due to their location on exterior walls.
