= Clotilde Pérez García =

American physician (1917–2003)

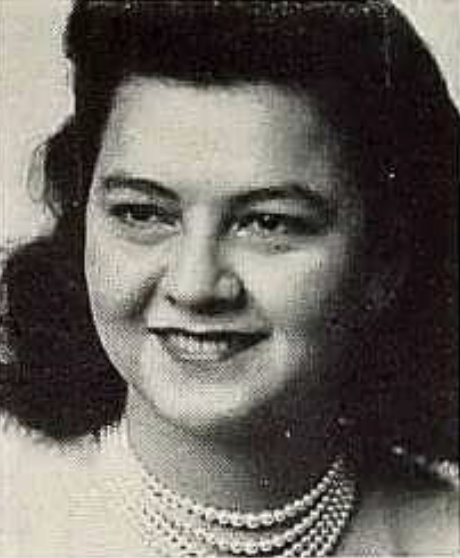
- Pérez García in 1951
- Born: January 9, 1917; Ciudad Victoria, Tamaulipas, Mexico
- Died: May 23, 2003 (aged 86); Corpus Christi, Texas, United States
- Education: University of Texas at Austin; University of Texas Medical Branch
- Occupation: Physician
- Relatives: Héctor P. García (brother)

Signature
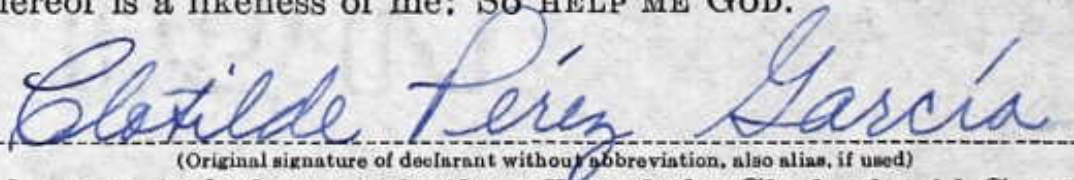

Clotilde Pérez García (January 9, 1917 - May 23, 2003) was a Mexican-American physician, activist, author, and educator. Her archival and activist efforts centered around Hispanics, co-founding the Spanish American Genealogical Association and American GI Forum; performing the latter with her brother Héctor P. García.

== Early life ==
García was born on January 9, 1917, in Ciudad Victoria, Tamaulipas, Mexico. Her father was college professor José García and her mother was school teacher Faustina Pérez García. García had six siblings, among them Hector P. García, who became a civil rights activist. She was the fourth of the seven children.

The same year García was born her family fled the violence of the Mexican Revolution, eventually settling in Mercedes, Texas, in 1918, where they had other family. Her parents opened a dry goods store. They continued to emphasize the importance of learning, and enriched their children's schoolwork with additional studies in the evenings. Their father encouraged them to become doctors, because, as García recalled: “[H]e said it was the only way you could be independent and serve humanity.’’ Ultimately, six of the seven siblings studied medicine.

Post-secondary schooling did not come all at once for García, however. In 1934, she graduated from Mercedes High School. García received an associate degree in 1936 from Edinburg Junior College (now part of the University of Texas Rio Grande Valley), then attended the University of Texas in Austin, graduating with a bachelor's degree in pre-med, zoology, and chemistry in 1938. She then returned home to support her family by teaching at several schools in South Texas through the 1940s. She later returned to study at the University of Texas, earning a master's in education in 1950.

== Medical career ==
García graduated from the University of Texas Medical Branch at Galveston in 1954—one of only seven women and the only Mexican-American woman in her class. She was among the first Mexican-American women to become a physician in Texas. She completed her internship at Corpus Christi Memorial Hospital and then opened a private practice. She was one of two women physicians practicing in Corpus Christi after she graduated, as well as one of only 5 Hispanic doctors in the region south of San Antonio.

She engaged in numerous medical activities, such as surgery, hospital and office visits, and house calls. However, delivering babies was one of her greatest strengths as a doctor. Garcia delivered over 10,000 babies throughout the course of her career, and many of these children were named Cleo. She often cared for patients who could not afford care, especially impoverished mothers. Garcia educated mothers on the importance of nutrition, hygiene, and preventative care. She retired from medicine in 1994.

== History and genealogy ==
García studied and promoted South Texas history, North Mexico history, and Hispanic genealogy. Her genealogy work in Northern Mexico pertained to the Nuevo Santander province. In recognition of her efforts, in 1990 she was awarded the Royal American Order of Isabella the Catholic by Juan Carlos I of Spain.

García published a translated account of the 1812 Siege of Camargo, and eight other books on local historical figures such as José Nicolás Ballí, Blas María de la Garza Falcón and Enrique Villareal. In 1987 she co-founded and served as the first president of the Spanish American Genealogical Association. In 1986, Garcia donated many of her personal books about Hispanic genealogy to the Corpus Christi Public Library system. García's collection of historical writings are currently housed at the Texas A&M University in Corpus Christi.

== Civic activity ==
Garcia faced discrimination because of her Mexican background and fought against such differential treatment. She was once denied access to the doctor's cafeteria in the hospital she worked on account of her race, and immediately protested this denial to administrators. Additionally, a property owner once refused to sell Garcia a lakefront house in Corpus Christi on account of her race. In response, she found a property nearby and built a new house on the land.

Garcia was highly active the in communities to which she belonged. Garcia served as the national health director of the League of United Latin American Citizens. She, along with her brother, started the American GI Forum. She also served on the board of directors for the Nueces County Anti-Poverty Program. Garcia's advocacy for those in need is further illustrated by her participation in the Valley Farm Workers Minimum Wage March of 1966. Additionally, Garcia was a member of the Task Force to Evaluate Medicaid Texas in addition to the Texas Constitution Revision Commission. Garcia also helped promote the presidential campaigns of John F. Kennedy and Lyndon B. Johnson in South Texas. Altogether, Garcia worked with over 29 different civic organizations to encourage social change. She received the Community Leader of America Award in 1969. Garcia was also inducted into the Texas Women's Hall of Fame.

Garcia was a strong advocate for education, and served as the regent of Del Mar College for 22 years. She served on the Del Mar College Vocational Nursing Advisory Committee as well as the Nueces County Hale-Aiken Committee, which helped improve the quality of local public education. She founded the Carmelite Day Nursery Parents and Friends Club, which supported education for children of the poor. As a whole, Garcia supported policies related to bilingual education, desegregation of public schools, and federally funded breakfast for young students.

== Legacy ==
Following her death in 2003, the Texas Senate published a resolution honoring Garcia and her family. The public library of Corpus Christi was named after Garcia in 2008. At Del Mar College, the new health sciences building constructed in 1983 was named after her. The Tejano Genealogy Society of Austin established the Clotilde P. Garcia Book Prize in her honor.
