= Olga Ramos (disambiguation) =

Olga Ramos can refer to:

- Olga Ramos (1918–2005), Spanish musician and actress.
- Olga Ramos (1962–2022), Venezuelan activist, professor and researcher.
- Olga Ramos Peña (1925–2024), American political organizer and activist.
