= Felix Z. Longoria Jr. =

United States Army soldier (1920–1945)

Felix Z. Longoria
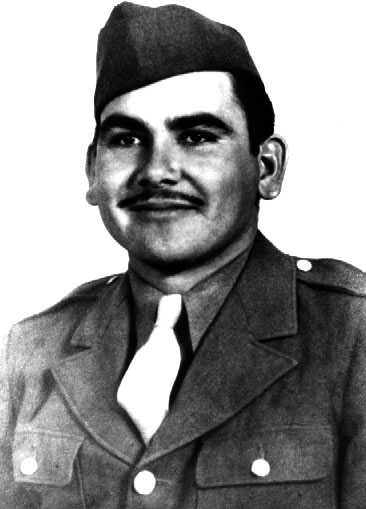
- Pvt. Felix Z. Longoria Jr.
- Born: April 16, 1920; Three Rivers, Texas, US
- Died: June 16, 1945 (aged 25); Philippines
- Burial place: Arlington National Cemetery
- Military career
- Allegiance: United States
- Branch: United States Army
- Rank: Private
- Conflicts: World War II
- Awards: Purple Heart; Combat Infantryman Badge

Felix Z. Longoria (April 16, 1920 – June 16, 1945) was an American soldier from Texas, who served in the United States Army as a private. He died during World War II and was buried at Arlington National Cemetery after veterans supported his cause in a dispute over his funerary arrangements.

Longoria was killed during the war, in the Philippines in 1945, but his body was not returned to his family until 1949. Upon receiving the body, his family attempted to arrange to bury him at the local cemetery, which was segregated and limited to whites. The only funeral home in town denied wake services since Felix was Mexican-American. The American GI Forum, a local activist group, fought against the injustice, and he was eventually buried in Arlington National Cemetery near Washington D.C.

== Personal ==
Born and raised in Three Rivers, Texas, Felix Longoria moved to Corpus Christi with his wife in search of work. He was working there as a truck driver and he and his wife had a four-year-old daughter. Feeling the call to service, in November 1944, Longoria enlisted in the US Army.

In late April 1945, he shipped out from Fort Ord, California, to the 27th Infantry Regiment of the 25th Infantry Division, then located in Luzon in the Philippines. He arrived on Luzon Island around June 1, 1945. The platoon was ambushed by a hidden Japanese machine gunner within two weeks of landing, and Longoria was among those killed. His remains were not recovered and identified until 1949. Once they were identified, the Army arranged to have them returned to the United States and to his family.

== Social climate ==
In Texas during the 1940s, as in other parts of the country, Mexican Americans were socially considered non-white but they were counted as white on the census. Segregation of Mexican American children in schools and employment discrimination against Mexican American workers was pervasive in the Southwestern United States. The town of Three Rivers was no exception. The section nearest the river and west of the railroad was set up for Mexican Americans to live in segregation (see referenced map: the streets west of the rail lines have names in Spanish).

Generally during World War II, Mexican-American servicemen were integrated into regular military units, but some served in segregated Mexican-American units, such as Company C, 141st Infantry Regiment, 36th Infantry Division of the Texas Army National Guard.

== Funeral and burial arrangements ==
The soldier's widow tried to make arrangements with the director of the funeral home in Three Rivers to hold a wake for Longoria at the funeral home. Tom Kennedy, the funeral home director, would not allow this. He said that because the late soldier was a "Mexican," "the whites would not like it." He repeated this sentiment in phone conversations with Hector P. Garcia and reporter, George Groh, of the Corpus Christi Caller. Kennedy was willing to set up a wake at the Longoria home, in the segregated area across the railroad tracks from the white section of town, as was the customary treatment of Mexican Americans by the Three Rivers community. Longoria was to be re-interred in the Longoria Cemetery (purchased by his father in 1925), which abutted the West side of the town's all-white cemetery. This portion of the cemetery, separated by a fence at that time, was reserved by the Three Rivers community for the Mexican Americans.

After an investigation into the Longoria Affair, U.S. Senator Lyndon B. Johnson offered to have Private Longoria's remains interred at Arlington National Cemetery. He wanted to end the controversy related to where the wake would be held prior to burial. When the New York Times reported on the local difficulties faced by Longoria's family in Three Rivers, the case attracted national attention and it became known as the Felix Longoria Affair. Walter Winchell on his radio program stated "The big state of Texas looks mighty small tonight".

Outraged Tejanos who sought to end such discrimination, organized under the newly formed American GI Forum and its leader, Hector P. Garcia. With the incident being reported by national papers, Freshman Senator Lyndon B. Johnson intervened in the case. He gained approval for Longoria's remains to be reinterred in Arlington National Cemetery in a full military ceremony, along with the remains of eighteen other soldiers whose remains had been repatriated from foreign soil where they had served and died. Full military honors were accorded each burial.

== Texas House of Representatives committee investigation ==
Under mounting national pressure, the State of Texas took action. The Texas House of Representatives appointed a five-person committee to investigate the allegations of racism. The Committee met in the Three Rivers Chamber of Commerce, next to the barber shop that served only whites. The committee conducted open hearings to take testimony, statements, and hear arguments on the issue. In the end, two reports were filed. The majority report found that no racism had occurred. Frank Oltorf, dissenting member, wrote a minority report concluding that the funeral home's actions were discriminatory based on race. The reports and supporting documentation were filed with the Texas House of Representatives. When one of the members removed his name from the majority report, both reports were pulled from the record. The summaries of both reports, without any supporting documentation, are all that survive.

== Decorations ==
- Purple Heart
- Good Conduct Medal
- Combat Infantryman Badge

== Chicano movement ==
What has now become known as the "Longoria Affair" was a pivotal moment in the early stages of the post-World War II Chicano Movement in the United States. The newly formed GI Forum (est. March 1948) was advocating on behalf of segregated Hispanic veterans receiving unequal treatment by the military in Corpus Christi. Mrs. Longoria and her sister contacted Hector P. Garcia, founder of the American GI Forum, who began lobbying for improvements. The national and international press picked up the story and the movement even impacted U.S.–Mexican relations.

The Felix Longoria affair became an early example of a unifying event in the Chicano Movement. The intervention of García and the American GI Forum in the matter led to an increased interest around the country in opening local chapters of the organization.

Among Mexican Americans and Hispanics across the country, the incident became a rallying point and a recruiting tool for the GI Forum that soon had chapters across the US.

== Texas Historical Marker ==
In 2004, Santiago Hernandez of Corpus Christi, who was an employee of the federal prison near Three Rivers, began a push for local recognition of Private Felix Longoria in Three Rivers. He proposed to name the city's post office in honor of Longoria. This revived former tensions and longstanding resentments, both among survivors and a new generation, related to the events of 1948–1949 and discrimination against Hispanics. In this atmosphere the proposal was rejected.

Hernandez gained permission from the Tejano owner of the now closed and dilapidated funeral home to place a Texas Historical Marker on the property. The Texas Historical Commission granted permission, over the objections of the local historical commission and the mostly white supporters of Mr. Kennedy to the marker and to the information on it. The marker was installed in the Spring of 2010, and many in the community attended the dedication. In 2014, new owners of the funeral home demolished it and converted the lot into a parking area. The historical marker was damaged in the process; after it was hit by a car soon after, it was removed. The new owners of the property asked that the marker not be returned after it was repaired, so it was rededicated and installed in the town square at the entrance to city hall.

The events of 1944 and the placement of the historical marker were covered in a documentary film: the film, The Longoria Affair. The exact words Mr. Kennedy reportedly used and his reasons for denying the use of the funeral home are disputed by some locals in Three Rivers, and the family and friends of Mr. Kennedy.
