= Oxnard Elementary School District =

School district in Ventura County, California

Address
- 1051 South A Street Oxnard, California, 93030; United States

District information
- Type: Public
- Grades: K–8
- NCES District ID: 0629220

Students and staff
- Students: 15,132 (2020–2021)
- Teachers: 690.5 (FTE)
- Staff: 806.44 (FTE)
- Student–teacher ratio: 21.91:1

Other information
- Website: www.oxnardsd.org

The Oxnard Elementary School District is located in the city of Oxnard, California. The district serves 16,500+ students, has 21 schools, and has over 700 teachers.

== Student makeup ==
The ethnic makeup is: 85% Hispanic, 8% White, 4% Asian, and 3% African American.

The gender makeup of the students is: 51% male and 49% female

== Schools ==
=== K-8 ===
- Cesar Chavez School
- Curren School
- Driffill School
- Kamala School
- Lemonwood School
- Marshall School
- Soria School

=== Middle School ===
- Dr. Manuel M. Lopez Academy
- Fremont Academy
- R.J. Frank Academy

=== Elementary ===
- Brekke Elementary School
- Christa McAuliffe School
- Elm Street Elementary School
- Harrington Elementary School
- Marina West Elementary School
- McKinna Elementary School
- Ramona Elementary School
- Ritchen Elementary School
- Rose Avenue Elementary
- Sierra Linda Elementary School

=== Preschool ===
- San Miguel Preschool

== History ==
In 1974, the Oxnard school board lost a court case, Soria v. Oxnard, which aimed at addressing decades of segregationist practices in Oxnard schools. Following the court order, integration strategies including busing were implemented to address racial imbalances in schools. In 2019, the use of glyphosate-based weed-killing products at the schools was banned by the board. Concerns have been raised about the mounting litigation over the safety of glyphosate and conflicting research findings on the risk of cancer upon exposure to the product. In 2018 a California jury awarded significant damages to a groundskeeper who argued that Monsanto provided inadequate warnings of cancer risks posed by the herbicides.
