= Olga Ramos Peña =

American activist (1925–2024)

- Born: July 22, 1925; San Antonio, Texas, U.S.
- Died: July 18, 2024 (aged 98)
- Years active: c. 1950s–1996
- Known for: Political organizer, activism
- Spouse(s): Albert Peña, Jr (married 1947—1972)

Olga Ramos Peña (July 22, 1925 – July 18, 2024) was an American political organizer and activist from San Antonio, Texas. She was one of the first Mexican Americans to join the Democratic Women's Club and recruited other women from the Hispanic and African American communities to join the Club. She also served as campaign manager for her husband Alberto Antonio Peña Jr. who was elected Bexar County Commissioner.

== Early life and education ==
Olga Peña was born in San Antonio in July 1925. Her parents were originally from Mexico and immigrated to the United States when they were young, and became U.S. citizens in 1937. Peña's childhood home was in West San Antonio, in a segregated neighborhood. Her mother, Francis Navarro Diaz was a stay-at-home mother and cared for her and her two younger brothers, Guadalupe and Hugo. Her father, Guadalupe Gutierrez Ramos, worked for a Mexican-owned soda manufacturer as a beverage delivery driver who delivered to various retailers in the San Antonio area. Peña, the oldest child, had two brothers, both veterans of wars. Her father used to drive her to school in his delivery truck as the family owned no vehicle.

Peña was educated and graduated from a segregated public school system in Bexar County. In her own words, “I grew up in the West Side on Leona Street and went to Navarro School for elementary and then to Joel Chandler Harris and finally San Antonio Tech High School.” As she recalls, “I had a very bad accent and spoke no English but was very lucky that I got one of the teachers who was bilingual, so she could teach us in both languages."

== Career ==
Peña was involved with various organizations, including the Democratic Women's Club, American GI Forum, and LULAC. She was responsible for organizing multiple political movements, the running of Albert's campaigns, and is noted as one of the first Mexican members of the Democratic Women's Club.

Peña retired in 1996 to take care of her aging parent.

== Personal life and death ==
As a child, Peña was involved with dancing. From the age of eight, was taught by many of the neighborhood's female dancers until she was proficient in dozens of traditional Mexican dances. She danced at assemblies in school, and dancing was her first paid job. She would dance at local San Antonio events, occasionally traveling to other cities for performances.

Peña met Albert Peña, Jr., a lawyer, and they married in September 1947, eventually having five children. They divorced in 1972.

Peña died in San Antonio on July 18, 2024 at the age of 98.
