= Mexican American Civil Rights Institute =

- Abbreviation: MACRI
- Formation: September 2019
- Headquarters: 2123 Buena Vista St, San Antonio, TX 78207
- Executive Director: Sarah Zenaida Gould, PhD
- National Advisory Council Chair: Cecilia Elizondo Herrera
- Scholars Council Chair: Stephen Pitti, PhD
- Website: https://www.somosmacri.org/
- Formerly called: National Institute of Mexican American History of Civil Rights

The Mexican American Civil Rights Institute (MACRI), located in San Antonio, Texas, is a national organization dedicated to documenting and recording Mexican American civil rights history.

== History ==
Founded in 2019, MACRI was first located in Our Lady of the Lake University in San Antonio, Texas. They opened a visitor's center on the west side of San Antonio. There are also plans of eventually opening a museum and archive building in the coming years. The Mexican American Civil Rights Institute is formerly known as the National Institute of Mexican American History of Civil Rights. MACRI was awarded $500,000 in startup money by the San Antonio City Council in September 2019.

== Visitors' center ==
The Mexican American Civil Rights Institute opened the doors to its visitors' center on October 14, 2023. Located on the West Side of San Antonio on the corner of Buena Vista Street and Navidad, the center resides inside a 1930s craftsman-style bungalow. Executive Director Sarah Zenaida Gould said the center will “give the public a taste of what an in-person experience could look like while we continue to put the pieces in place for a permanent museum and archive.” The ribbon cutting ceremony included performances by Guadalupe Dance Company, Mariachi Azteca de America, and Bombasta.

== Exhibits ==
On the institute's website, an online exhibit can be found by the name of “CHISPAS: Mexican American Civil Rights Trailblazers in San Antonio.”

== See also ==
- History of Mexican Americans in Texas
