= Alicia Escalante =

American Chicana activist (born 1933)

- Born: 1933 (age 92–93); El Paso, Texas
- Occupation: Activist

Alicia Escalante is a Chicana activist who was active during the Chicano Movement. She was the founder and chair of the East Los Angeles Chicana Welfare Rights Organization from 1967 to 1978.

== Early life ==
Alicia Escalante was born Alicia Lara in El Paso, Texas in 1933. She was the second oldest of seven children. Escalante's mother eventually left her abusive father. At twelve, Escalante ran away in search of her mother, eventually reuniting with her in Boyle Heights, East Los Angeles. Times were rough for the family, and barley survived with meager assistance from welfare. She was cured of hearing loss by a doctor who donated his services.

== Public activities ==
In 1967, Escalante formed the East Los Angeles Chicana Welfare Rights Organization, an organization dedicated to assisting the Spanish-speaking community in particular. By advocating for and representing welfare recipients through implementation of existing laws that were the rights of recipients to begin with. She also advocated for new rights in relation to English Translation, Child Care and Job Training and implementing Affirmative Action.

She was one of thirty-five arrested in the 1968 Board of Education "sit-in" in favor of Sal Castro's reinstatement. She participated in the 1968 Poor Peoples Campaign. Organizing community single mothers with children along with her own children and traveling by Grey Hound Bus from Los Angeles CA to Washington DC. She participated in the 1969 Catolicos Por Mi Raza at Saint Basil's Church, Mid-Night Mass Demonstration along with her children and was arrested and sentenced to 30 days in jail. She was encouraged by Corky Gonzales in 1969–1970 to establish CWRO in Denver, Colorado. Chicana community. And participated with activities and events with Crusade For Justice and Esquela Tlatelolco. She participated in the 1969 and February 1970 and August 1970 Chicano Moratoriums. She participated in an all-women's 1969 World Hunger Tour having been chosen and sponsored by the Presbyterian Church.

In 1973, Encuentro Femenil published Escalante's essay entitled "A Letter from The Chicana Welfare Rights Organization". In a subsequent interview, Adelaida Del Castillo, Associate Editor of the journal, cited the publication of the letter as a significant event in the journal's history. She characterized Escalante as being a part of Chicana feminism. In that same year, she was depicted in a mural created by Ruben Reyna and Mario R Gonzales at the University of Houston, entitled The Chicano Mural, alongside other Chicano Movement leaders like Corky Gonzales, José Ángel Gutiérrez and Reyes Lopez Tijerina.

In 2009, she was recognized by the National Chicano Moratorium Committee for her work.
