= Mario Cantu =

Mauro Casiano Cantu, Jr. (April 2, 1937 – November 9, 2000) was a restaurant owner, Chicano activist, advocate and member of a Marxist–Leninist–Maoist Mexican guerrilla group, as well as a spokesman for human rights for Chicanos and Mexicans both in the US and in Mexico.

== Early history ==
Cantu was the oldest of four children. Growing up, he worked at the family business, a small 24-hour grocery store on the West Side of San Antonio called the M. Cantu Super Mercado, which later became Mario’s restaurant. Today, the site is home to the University of Texas at San Antonio Downtown Campus. However, in the early 1960s Cantu became involved in selling drugs, which led to his arrest during a heroin run to Monterrey, Mexico in 1963. After his arrest, Cantu spent six years in federal prison at Terre Haute, Indiana. During his time in prison, Puerto Rican nationalists influenced Cantu in becoming a radical Chicano activist.

== Activism ==
Cantu was released from prison in 1969 and returned to San Antonio with a new sense of Chicano nationalism that led him to get involved as the Chairman of the organizing committee for the activities of “Semana de la Raza” (The People’s Week). He also founded “Tu-Casa,” an organization created to aid Mexican illegal immigrants to obtain legal status in the US and formed a committee to examine police brutality against Chicanos.

On June 18, 1976, the Immigration and Naturalization Service (INS) arrested him for harboring undocumented aliens at his restaurant. Although Cantu was able to rally support from Chicano activists such as Cesar Chavez and Rodolfo “Corky” Gonzalez through the Mario Cantu Defense Committee, at the end he was convicted to five years probation, which made him the first American ever convicted for this crime. The trial was conducted by Judge John H. Wood Jr., who would later be assassinated by Charles Harrelson, father of Hollywood actor Woody Harrelson. Defending Cantu at the trial was civil rights lawyer William Kunstler and local counsel Pete Torres of San Antonio.

At the same time, Cantu became involved with Florencio “Güero” Medrano Mederos, the charismatic leader of a Marxist–Leninist–Maoist guerrilla group in Southern Mexico called Partido Proletario Unido de America (PPUA). The PPUA was a guerrilla movement that sought to arm and organize peasants in south-central Mexico over the struggle of land ownership and to initiate a Pan-American revolutionary movement. Cantu suggested in several interviews that he aided the PPUA by smuggling guns into Mexico as well as giving them financial support for their activities. Among those enlisted by Cantu to transport weapons to Mexico was Vietnam-era veteran, Thomas Wakely, a former member of the Social Workers Party, and a left-wing political activist in San Antonio at that time.

However, in 1978 the American courts summoned Cantu to explain his travels to Mexico since they were a violation of his probation. Instead of appearing in court, Cantu chose self-exile to Europe where he traveled through Spain, Germany, and France speaking against the injustices against Chicanos and Mexicans. Cantu returned to San Antonio a year later in 1979 to face a probation revocation hearing and then served his sentence at a correctional halfway house in San Antonio.

After the completion of his sentence, Cantu retired from his political activism and focused his attention on expanding his restaurant business and organizing community events in San Antonio.
