= Héctor P. García =

Mexican-American physician, surgeon, and WWII veteran (1914–1996)

Héctor Perez García
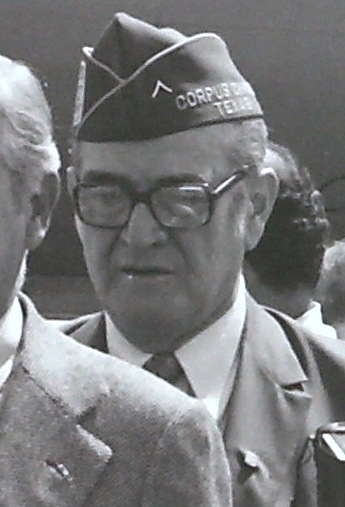
- Héctor P. García in 1976
- Born: January 17, 1914; Llera, Tamaulipas, Mexico
- Died: July 26, 1996 (aged 82); Corpus Christi, Texas, United States
- Resting place: Seaside Funeral Home & Memorial Park, Corpus Christi, Texas
- Education: University of Texas at Austin; University of Texas Medical Branch; Creighton University
- Occupations: Physician; surgeon; activist
- Known for: American GI Forum
- Spouse: Wanda Fusillo (m. 1945)
- Children: Daisy Wanda Garcia, Héctor Garcia Jr, Adriana Cecilia Garcia, Susanna Patricia Garcia
- Parents: José García; Faustina Pérez García
- Relatives: José Antonio García (brother); Clotilde Pérez García (sister); Cuitláhuac Pérez García (brother); Xicotencátl Pérez García (brother); Emilia García Garza (sister); Dalia Perez García (sister)

Héctor Pérez García (January 17, 1914 – July 26, 1996) was a Mexican-American physician, surgeon, World War II veteran, civil rights advocate, and founder of the American GI Forum (AGIF). As a result of the national prominence he earned through his work on behalf of Hispanic Americans, he was instrumental in the appointment of Vicente T. Ximenes, a Mexican American and AGIF charter member, to the Equal Employment Opportunity Commission in 1966.

García was named as alternate representative to the United Nations in 1967; was appointed to the US Commission on Civil Rights in 1968; was awarded the Presidential Medal of Freedom, the nation's highest civilian honor, in 1984; and was named to the Order of St. Gregory the Great by Pope John Paul II in 1990. In 1998, he was posthumously given the Order of the Aztec Eagle, Mexico's highest award for foreigners, in a ceremony in Corpus Christi.

== Early life ==
García was born in the city of Llera, Tamaulipas, Mexico, to José García and Faustina Pérez García, both school teachers.His family fled the violence of the Mexican Revolution in 1917, legally immigrating to Mercedes, Texas. His father's professional credentials were not recognized in this new country, so he went into the dry goods business. Both parents instilled a love and respect for education in all of their children and expected them all to become medical doctors. García and five of his siblings—José Antonio García, Clotilde Pérez García, Cuitláhuac Pérez García, Xicotencátl Pérez García, and Dalia García-Malison—did become physicians. In 1929, García joined the Citizens' Military Training Corps (CMTC), a peacetime branch of the US Army for youths. He graduated from a segregated high school in 1932. That year, he earned a commission from the CMTC with a rank equivalent to a second lieutenant in the US infantry. He began attending Edinburg Junior College, to and from which he had to hitchhike 30 miles (48 km) daily. His father had to cash in his life insurance policy to finance young García's education. In 1932, García entered the University of Texas at Austin, graduating with a degree in zoology. He was one of the top five of his class. He went on to study at the University of Texas Medical Branch, earning his doctorate in medicine in 1940. He accomplished his residency at St. Joseph's Hospital at Creighton University in Omaha, Nebraska, in 1942.

== Army career ==
Upon completing his internship in 1942, Hector P. García was called to active duty in the United States Army, as the US had entered World War II. Garcia was placed in command of a company of infantry and later commanded a company of combat engineers before being transferred to the medical corps.

Hector P. Garcia was stationed in Europe, and eventually rose to the rank of major. He was awarded the Bronze Star Medal, the European African Middle Eastern Medal with six bronze stars, and the World War II Victory Medal.

While in Italy, he met and fell in love with Wanda Fusillo of Naples, whom he married in 1945.

== Life after the war ==
In 1945, with the war over, Dr. García returned to South Texas with his wife Wanda, settling in Corpus Christi.Their first child, Daisy Wanda, was born in 1946.The League of United Latin American Citizens (LULAC) had been formed in the city seven years previously by Hispanic veterans to defend the rights of Hispanic-American citizens. García opened a private medical practice with his brother José Antonio; they treated all patients regardless of their ability to pay.

In 1947, García was elected president of the local chapter of LULAC. In the same year, he was hospitalized with life-threatening acute nephritis. While recuperating, he became aware of racial segregation within the local school district. Southern states had established a binary system, classifying people as either Black or white and segregating public facilities by race. During this time, García became increasingly committed to addressing discrimination and inequality affecting Mexican Americans.

== Founding of AGIF ==
After being discharged from the hospital, Héctor P. García began assisting Mexican American veterans with filing claims with the U.S. Veterans Administration (VA), which was often slow to respond to their needs.

In 1948, García organized a meeting to address concerns among these veterans, which led to the founding of the American GI Forum (AGIF). The organization expanded throughout Texas and became a key advocate for civil rights and equal treatment of Mexican American veterans.

The AGIF emphasized that its members were American citizens entitled to full constitutional rights and worked to challenge discrimination affecting this community.

== Felix Z. Longoria Jr. ==
Felix Z. Longoria Jr., a Mexican American soldier, was killed in the Philippines during World War II in 1945. His body was returned to Texas in 1949. His widow was denied the use of a funeral chapel in Three Rivers, Texas, after the funeral director stated that “the whites would not like it.”

Héctor P. García and the American GI Forum (AGIF) intervened and sought assistance from U.S. Senator Lyndon B. Johnson. Johnson arranged for Longoria to be buried at Arlington National Cemetery, making him the first Mexican American to be buried there.

The case received national attention and highlighted discrimination against Mexican Americans in the United States.It also increased the prominence of AGIF as a civil rights organization.

== AGIF in American politics ==
The American GI Forum (AGIF) helped Mexican Americans participate in politics by organizing voter registration efforts and poll tax drives in the late 1940s and 1950s.The organization raised funds to assist individuals who could not afford poll taxes and advocated for equal access to voting.

It also campaigned against the Bracero Program, which recruited migrant laborers during the war years and was associated with discriminatory practices.

This work brought García into contact with national political figures such as Hubert Humphrey, Arthur Goldberg, and George McGovern. The organization also drew attention to poverty and public health issues in Texas, which were highlighted in an article published by Look magazine that reported high rates of disease in affected communities.

García also worked to bring national attention to the conditions of schools for children in South Texas. In 1950, he wrote to the Texas Department of Health expressing concerns about sanitation and requesting inspections to prevent disease and outbreaks. He also opposed school segregation and discrimination in the classroom.

Some individuals opposed García’s work and expressed hostility toward the American GI Forum. One hostile letter threatened García, comparing him to Joseph Stalin and saying that Texans should "drive [him] back to Mexico".[8]

In 1953, AGIF published its own study, What Price Wetbacks, addressing issues related to farm labor in South Texas. The organization invited U.S. Senator Lyndon B. Johnson to speak at its statewide convention. In 1954, attorneys supported by AGIF and the League of United Latin American Citizens (LULAC) argued and won Hernandez v. Texas in the U.S. Supreme Court. The decision overturned the plaintiff’s murder conviction on the grounds that he had not been tried by a jury of his peers, as court records showed that no individuals with Spanish surnames had served on juries in the county for 25 years.

In Brown v. Board of Education, the Supreme Court ruled that racial segregation in public schools was unconstitutional. Following this decision, LULAC and AGIF pursued legal challenges in Texas to promote the integration of schools for Mexican American students. These efforts included cases brought before the Texas Supreme Court challenging the practices of school districts in Driscoll, Carrizo Springs, and Kingsville.

In 1960, Dr. García became national coordinator of the Viva Kennedy Campaign, organized to support the election of John F. Kennedy as president. García is credited with helping mobilize Hispanic voters during the election. The civil rights agenda of AGIF, however, was not a primary focus of the Kennedy administration. In 1962, García was appointed as a representative of the United States in mutual defense treaty talks with the West Indies Federation, marking one of the first instances in which a Mexican American represented a U.S. president in an official capacity.

After Kennedy was assassinated, Vice President Lyndon B. Johnson assumed the presidency. He later appointed García as Presidential Representative, with the rank of Special Ambassador, to the inauguration ceremonies of Raúl Leoni in Venezuela.

In 1966, through the efforts of AGIF and other groups, the state legislature voted to repeal the Texas poll tax, which had been a barrier to voting for low-income individuals. The forum also organized a march on the Texas state capitol to protest the low wages of Mexican agricultural laborers. In 1967, President Lyndon B. Johnson appointed Dr. García as alternate representative, with the rank of ambassador to the United Nations.[9]

He was tasked with improving United States relations with Latin American nations. On October 26, he addressed the United Nations in Spanish, becoming the first U.S. representative to speak before the body in a language other than English.

Starting in 1968, Dr. García and other members of AGIF began accompanying families of fallen soldiers to the airport to receive the remains of service members returning from the Vietnam War. He frequently delivered eulogies at funerals for these soldiers.

In the same year, President Lyndon B. Johnson appointed García to the United States Commission on Civil Rights. In 1972, García was arrested during a sit-in protest against de facto segregation in the Corpus Christi school district. He consulted with President Jimmy Carter several times during the 1970s. In 1987, he became involved in efforts opposing campaigns to designate English as the only official language of the United States. His final project focused on improving living conditions in the colonias along the Rio Grande Valley on the United States–Mexico border.

== Death ==
García died on July 26, 1996, in Corpus Christi, Texas, at the age of 82. He was buried at Seaside Memorial Park. President Bill Clinton delivered a eulogy in his honor.

== Honors and awards ==
Dr. García received numerous awards from various governments and other organizations during his lifetime. They include:

- The US Army's Bronze Star Medal, the European African Middle Eastern Campaign Medal with six bronze stars, and the World War II Victory Medal, 1942–1946
- AGIF's Medalla al Merito, 1952, for his work with Mexican-American veterans
- National Coordinator and National Organizer of the "Viva Kennedy" clubs, 1960
- Representative of President John F. Kennedy and member of the American Delegation signing treaty concerning Mutual Defense Area Agreement between the US and the Federation of the West Indies, 1961
- Appointed as presidential representative with the rank of Special Ambassador to the inauguration of Dr. Raul Leoni, President of Venezuela, 1964
- Accompanied Vice-president Hubert H. Humphrey and the US Delegation for the signing of the Treaty of Tlatelolco in Mexico City, 1967
- The Republic of Panama's Condecoracion, Orden Vasco Nunez de Balboa, with the rank of commander, 1965
- The 8th US Marine Corps District honored him with a plaque in recognition of his service to the war deceased, 1967
- A humanitarian award from the Corpus Christi chapter of the National Association for the Advancement of Colored People, 1969
- The Distinguished Service Award from the National Office of Civil Rights, 1980
- The Presidential Medal of Freedom, 1984
- Honor Al Merito Medalla Cura Jose Maria Morelos y Pavon A.D.P.E., Mexico City, Mexico
- Corpus Christi Human Relations Commission's Community Service Award, 1987
- The Coalition of Hispanic Health and Human Services Organization's Humanitarian Award, 1988
- The National Hispanic Heritage Foundation's Hispanic Heritage Award in Leadership, 1989
- The Midwest/Northeast Voter Registration Project's National Hispanic Hero Award, 1989
- Received the "Distinguished Alumnus Award" from the University of Texas Ex-Students Association, 1989
- Dr. Garcia designated Corpus Christi State University as the institution to house his papers in the Special Collections and Archives Department of the Library, 1990
- MAPA Award for outstanding service to Hispanics from the Mexican American Physicians' Association, 1990
- The National Association of Hispanic Journalists' Distinguished Lifetime Service Award, 1990
- The Equestrian Order of Pope Gregory the Great from Pope John Paul II, 1990
- Corpus Christi State University's first honorary doctorate of Humane Letters, 1991
- The Dr. Hector P. Garcia Plaza and Statue were dedicated at Texas A&M University–Corpus Christi, 1996
- Hector P. Garcia Elementary School, Grand Prairie, Texas, opened, 1997
- Hector P. Garcia Elementary School, Temple, Texas, opened, 1998
- Dr. García's image was placed on the US Treasury's $75 I Bond series honoring great Americans, 1999
- Hector Garcia Place is a short street named after Dr. García, located in downtown Pueblo, Colorado
- The Hector P. Garcia Middle School, Dallas, Texas, opened in 2007
- The Major Hector P. Garcia, MD High School opened in Chicago, Illinois, in 2008
- Texas State Highway 286 was named the Dr. Hector P. Garcia Memorial Highway in April, 2008
- The Dr. Hector P. Garcia Middle School was established and dedicated in San Antonio, Texas, in October, 2009
- Bronze bust of Dr. Héctor P. García was dedicated at the Dr. Hector P. Garcia Public Library, Mercedes, Texas, in January, 2012
- Texas Historical Marker unveiled at the Dr. Hector P. Garcia Public Library, Mercedes, Texas, in 2013
- Dr. Hector P. Garcia's Official 100th Birthday Celebration observed in Corpus Christi, Texas, January 17, 2014
- Texas Historical Marker unveiled at Christus Spohn Memorial Hospital, Corpus Christi, Texas, February, 2014
- Dr. Hector P. Garcia Memorial Family Health Center approved by Nueces County Commissioners and the Hospital District to be opened in 2016
- Dr. Hector P. Garcia Drive in Rancho Vista subdivision, Corpus Christi, Texas, unveiled by Braselton Homes, January 13, 2015
- Points of Light Monument Organization reveals its next recipient will be Dr. Héctor P. García, January 15, 2016

== Legacy ==
As one of the early leaders of the Hispanic civil rights, García's activities foreshadowed much of the struggle of the Chicano Movement. As a figure of national and international prominence, the effects of his life have been felt at all levels of society, from the poor barrios that he fought to improve, to the highest echelons of government. The end of the 1950s desegregated Texan hotels, cinemas, and restaurants. Beauty parlors and barbershops were desegregated in the 1960s, with cemeteries and swimming pools not being opened to Mexican Americans until the 1970s.

In the realm of popular culture, in 1950, Pulitzer Prize winner Edna Ferber interviewed García to get a sense of the Mexican American experience in Texas. She later wrote the 1952 novel Giant, basing some of the incidents in the work on her interview. The book was later turned into a 1956 film starring James Dean, Elizabeth Taylor, Rock Hudson, and Dennis Hopper.

In 1985, the Dr. Héctor Pérez García Endowed Chair was created at Yale University. In 1988, the main branch of the Corpus Christi post office was renamed in his honor. In 1996, a nine-foot (2.7 m) statue of him was dedicated at Texas A&M University–Corpus Christi. In 1999, his image was placed on the US Treasury's $75 I Bond series honoring great Americans.

In 2002, public television station KEDT in Corpus Christi, Texas, produced a documentary on him entitled "Justice for my People: The Dr. Hector P. Garcia Story". The program was broadcast nationally on PBS.

Under Senate Bill 495, signed on May 30, 2009, by the governor of Texas, the state of Texas established the third Wednesday of each September as "Dr. Hector P. Garcia Texas State Recognition Day".

In April 2010, the US House of Representatives passed H.CON.RES.222, recognizing the leadership and historical contributions of Dr. Héctor García to the Hispanic community and his remarkable efforts to combat racial and ethnic discrimination in the US.
