= Soria v. Oxnard =

U.S. court case concerning racial desegregation

- Court: United States District Court for the Central District of California
- Full case name: Debbie and Doreen Soria et al. v. Oxnard School District Board of Trustees
- Decided: December 10, 1974

Court membership
- Judge sitting: Harry Pregerson

Soria v. Oxnard School District Board of Trustees, 386 F. Supp. 539, was a federal desegregation case decided by the United States District Court for the Central District of California. The case was brought on behalf of Mexican-American students in the Oxnard School District, who argued that the district had maintained racially segregated schools through the use of administrative boundaries and enrollment policies. The court ruled in favor of the plaintiffs, finding that the district had failed to provide equal educational opportunities and ordering the implementation of a desegregation plan. The ruling built on a long history of racial segregation in Oxnard's public schools. Scholars have documented how the district used school construction, attendance boundaries, and residential patterns to maintain racially imbalanced schools even after Brown v. Board of Education (1954). Community organizations, including the Ventura County Community Service Organization and the NAACP had previously pushed for reform through local advocacy before litigation became necessary.

== Background ==
The segregation of Oxnard public schools that eventually led to a federal court order in Soria v. Oxnard began many decades prior. Segregation wasn't mentioned in a local school board meeting until 1934, though Ventura county school officials expressed opposition to the education of Mexican children as early as 1928. Oxnard began in the early 1900s as a primarily agricultural town that attracted the need for manual laborers, including Mexican and Japanese immigrants, and by 1940 had a larger population of Mexican-Americans than white citizens. Mexicans and Mexican-Americans in Oxnard were blamed for local problems as early as 1917, including poor sanitation in some Oxnard neighborhoods and schools. Despite efforts in the early 20th century to concentrate new schools near predominantly white neighborhoods, demands for formal segregation in Oxnard schools increased throughout the 1930s and continued for the next four decades until Soria.

Minutes from Oxnard school board meetings mention no official academic or social rationale for segregation. This segregation took a different form than that common during the same time period in the American South - even before segregation was explicitly mentioned by the school board, Mexican American children in Oxnard were placed into separate classrooms in the Roosevelt, Wilson and Haydock schools. In 1939, plans were approved to construct a new elementary school in the predominantly Mexican La Colonia neighborhood in response to claimed concern for the safety of students who crossed railroad tracks to attend school in addition to growing complaints from white parents about the large numbers of Mexican students in Oxnard's other schools. This school, named Ramona, was constructed for $3500 less than the district's three other elementary schools, and did not include kindergarten facilities. As a result, Mexican students zoned to attend Ramona were frequently placed in "pre-first" classes upon starting school at age six, falling behind their peers at other district schools.

In response to these educational disparities, local community activists began campaigning for integration primarily in the 1960s. Rachel Murguia Wong, an educator and community organizer, was elected to the Oxnard school board in 1970 after working in district elementary schools for the prior two years. She was Oxnard's first ethnically Mexican school board member, and quickly became a voice for school integration. The Ventura County Community Service Organization also played a role in early desegregation efforts, including by joining with the Ventura County NAACP chapter to oppose a 1962 school bond for the construction of a new elementary-middle school that would increase de facto segregation of Latino and Black students.

These efforts preceded future efforts of Latino and Black Oxnard residents to challenge de facto segregation through legal means.

== Court case ==
After attorney Gerhard W. Orthuber and community organizer Juan L. Soria developed a legal complaint against the de facto and de jure segregation present in Oxnard schools, the Legal Service Center of Ventura County filed a class-action lawsuit against the Oxnard School Board of Trustees on February 20, 1970. Orthuber and Soria gathered a group of ten Mexican and Black children from Oxnard schools to serve as plaintiffs, including two of Soria's nieces, Debbie and Doreen Soria, leading to the case's official name, Debbie and Doreen Soria et al. v. Oxnard School Board of Trustees et al. The lawsuit was filed after multiple failed attempts by community groups to integrate Oxnard schools, and after the Oxnard school board failed to follow any recommendations for integration, including those in a 1963 NAACP report, those proposed in 1968 by Oxnard superintendent Seawright H. Stewart, and those included in a 1969 report by the California Department of Education's Bureau of Intergroup Relations.

After the case was assigned to Judge Harry Pregerson of the US Central District Court, the plaintiffs argued using precedent from other court cases such as Spangler v. Pasadena City Board of Education to claim that the Oxnard school board had not made a substantial effort to integrate schools, thus failing in their duties and creating a situation of de jure segregation. On May 12, 1971, Pregerson issued a summary judgement holding the school board accountable for fostering an integrated school environment. The judgement stated, "segregated elementary schools denied plaintiffs their rights to equal protection of the laws, guaranteed by the fourteenth amendment. To redress that denial, this court charged the school board with an affirmative duty to provide plaintiffs with a racially balanced elementary school system." The judgement also gave the school board 20 days to present an interim integration plan, which was adopted by the court on July 21, 1971 and met with opposition by Oxnard community members who opposed busing as an integration strategy.

Soria defendants continued to appeal the case for three years, arguing that they did not intentionally maintain a system of segregation in Oxnard schools. At the request of the defendants, Soria was returned to trial in 1973 and the final case opinion was issued by Judge Pregerson in December 1974. In his opinion, Pregerson cited newly uncovered Oxnard school board minutes from the 1930s that pointed to an intentional and long-standing system of segregation. In this opinion, Judge Pregerson stated that "In short, the court finds that the segregation which in fact existed in the district's elementary schools prior to the implementation of the court ordered desegregation plan was caused by the School Board's intentional, deliberate, and purposeful policy of racial segregation."

== Aftermath ==
Following the 1974 decision in Soria v. Oxnard School District Board of Trustees, the Oxnard School District was required to implement measures to eliminate racial imbalance in its schools. The court's ruling led to the adoption of desegregation plans that include two-way busing between racially imbalanced schools for students in kindergarten through sixth grade, to achieve greater racial integration. The plan drew significant public opposition, approximately 300 community members attended a school board meeting to protest the busing program, with some speakers calling on board members to defy the federal order. Black residents who attended the meeting offered a range of perspectives. Bill Terry stated that he was personally opposed to busing but argued that minority communities had experienced long-standing rights violations. He also expressed skepticism about whether classroom integration alone would improve educational outcomes, and stated that his children attended the neighborhood school where his family lived. Richard Brown questioned the fairness of the 15 percent margin used to measure racial imbalance across schools, arguing it was inconsistent unless applied equally to all racial, national, and religious groups. Another resident expressed concern that rising busing costs could reduce funding for educational programs, citing the experiences of cities such as New York and New Jersey, a concern Superintendent Tregarthen acknowledged. One speaker urged the audience to apply the same standard consistently, arguing that rights should be defended whenever they are violated, not only when directly affected. Accounts from past students state that while integration changed the schools demographic, social division was often persisted within schools. One former student recounts that students continued to self-segregate along ethnic and social lines during informal settings such as lunchtime.

The school board's response to the ruling was characterized by reluctant compliance. A May 1971 editorial in the Oxnard Press-Courier referenced remarks by the Oxnard Superintendent acknowledging what he described as "disadvantages to total integration," while also calling on residents to cooperate with the court order. Scholars have noted that the district had a long history of resisting integration efforts, having previously used administrative and residential boundaries to maintain racially imbalanced schools even after Brown v. Board of Education (1954). The court's desegregation order did not end the district's involvement with the federal courts. Judge Pregerson continued to monitor whether the Oxnard School District was following through on the order, even after he was appointed to a higher court, the Ninth Circuit U.S. Court of Appeals. In the mid-1980s, the district was found to not be meeting the requirements of the order. The legal organization that had originally represented the plaintiffs, Channel Counties Legal Services Association (CCLSA), went back to court to address this. The school board resisted, and its president threatened to report CCLSA to its federal funding source unless the organization dropped the matter. CCLSA refused. Judge Pregerson eventually ended his oversight of the district, closing more than a decade of federal monitoring that had begun with the 1971 ruling.
