= American GI Forum =

Hispanic veterans organization

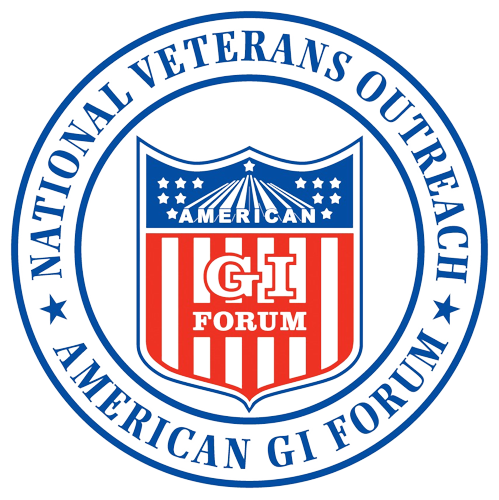
- Founded: March 26, 1948
- Founder: Hector P. Garcia
- Location: Washington, DC
- Key people: David Rodriguez, National Commander
- Website: www.agifus.com

The American GI Forum (AGIF) is a congressionally chartered Hispanic veterans and civil rights organization founded in 1948. Its motto is "Education is Our Freedom and Freedom should be Everybody's Business". AGIF operates chapters throughout the United States, with a focus on veterans' issues, education, and civil rights. Its two largest national programs are the San Antonio-based Veterans Outreach Program, and the Dallas-based Service, Employment, Redevelopment-Jobs for Progress, Inc. (SER). The current National Commander is David Rodriguez.

== Origin ==
The organization was established in Corpus Christi, the seat of Nueces County, Texas, on March 26, 1948, by Dr. Hector P. Garcia to address the concerns of Mexican-American veterans, who were segregated from other veterans groups. Initially formed to request services for World War II veterans of Mexican descent who were denied medical services by the United States Department of Veterans Affairs, the AGIF soon entered into non-veteran's issues such as voting rights, jury selection, and educational desegregation, advocating for the civil rights of all Mexican Americans. In 1959, the organization claimed 25,000 members in 18 states. Today, the AGIF advocates on behalf of all Hispanic veterans.

The AGIF's first campaign was on the behalf of Felix Longoria, a Mexican-American private who was killed in the Philippines in the line of duty during World War II. Three years after the war, when Longoria's remains were returned to Texas, his family was denied funeral services by a white-owned funeral home. Dr. Garcia requested the intercession of then-Senator Lyndon B. Johnson, who secured Longoria's burial in Arlington National Cemetery. The case brought the AGIF to national attention, and chapters were opened throughout the country. A women's and youth auxiliary were also formed.

The AGIF, along with the League of United Latin American Citizens, was a plaintiff in the landmark civil rights case of Hernandez v. Texas (1954). Pete Hernandez, a farm worker in Texas, was convicted of murder by an all-white jury. His attorneys appealed his conviction because Mexican Americans had been systematically excluded for years from Texas juries. But, since they were classified as white, the state court said a white jury constituted a "jury of peers" for Hernandez. His defense attorneys took the case to the Supreme Court of the United States, becoming the first Mexican-American attorneys to appear there. They argued that Texas discriminated against Mexican Americans as a class and Hernandez's rights were violated by Texas' exclusion of Mexican Americans from all juries. In its unanimous decision, Hernandez v. Texas (1954), the court ruled that Mexican Americans were a class in this case, as discrimination against them was proven, and that they and all other racial or national groups in the United States had equal protection under the 14th Amendment of the US Constitution.

In contrast to LULAC, the America GI Forum was more willing to engage in oppositional politics and some of its members wearing their caps marched in solidarity with Chicano protestors. Between 1969 and 1979, the Forum led a national boycott against the Adolph Coors Company, one of the largest beer producers in the nation, challenging the corporation's discriminatory employment practices affecting Chicanos.

== Geography ==
Like LULAC, the AGIF rooted itself in Texas and spread slowly to other states. In 1954, AGIF chapters were present in 16 states but the majority of the chapters were in Texas. It was not until the 1960s that the organization became popular in California, and councils were founded in the East Coast in Connecticut, Maryland, and Washington D.C. And by 1974, AGIF has a noticeable presence throughout the country including the Pacific Northwest and some chapters in the South.

== Past Presidents/Commanders ==
- Dr. Hector P. Garcia
- Tony Gallegos
- Jake I. Alarid (1983-1984 and 1994-1998)
- Francisco Ivarra
- Antonio Gil Morales (2005 – 2009)
- Albert Gonzales (2010-2013)
- Luis Vazquez-Contes (2013-2014)
- Ángel Zúñiga (2014–2018)
- Lawrence G. Romo (2018–2021)
- Luis Vasquez-Contes (2021-2023)
- David Rodriquez (2023–Present)

== Organization and Chapters ==
Each local chapter elects a "Commander" and a state chairperson. A yearly national convention is held to elect national high officers.

- Arizona , Silvestre S. Herrera (Phoenix) Chapter
- California
- Colorado Mile Hi Chapter
- Idaho
- Illinois
- Kansas
- Michigan , Flint Chapter
- Nebraska, Omaha Chapter
- New Mexico
- Oklahoma
- Puerto Rico
- Texas
- Utah
- Washington
- Washington, D.C.
- Wyoming

== See also ==
- LNESC
- Latino
- NALEO
- NCLR
- SVREP
- LULAC
- MALDEF
