= List of Mexican-American writers =

The following is a list of Mexican-American writers.

== A-C ==
- Oscar Zeta Acosta
- Rodolfo Acuña
- Kathleen Alcala
- Alurista
- Rudolfo Anaya, author of children's book Bless Me, Ultima
- Gloria E. Anzaldúa, author of Borderlands/La Frontera: The New Mestiza and co-author of This Bridge Called My Back: Writings by Radical Women of Color
- Ron Arias
- Jimmy Santiago Baca, author and poet
- José Antonio Burciaga
- Nash Candelaria
- Xochiquetzal Candelaria
- Norma Elia Cantú
- Ana Castillo, author of So Far from God
- Rafael C. Castillo
- Lorna Dee Cervantes
- Angelico Chavez
- Denise Chávez, an author and playwright
- Sandra Cisneros
- Lucha Corpi
- Margarita Cota-Cárdenas, author of Puppet: A Chicano Novella (in Spanish; 1985)

== D-J ==
- Alicia Gaspar de Alba, author of Desert Blood
- Adina Emilia De Zavala
- Lorenzo de Zavala
- Abelardo Delgado, author of Letters to Louise (1982)
- Roberta Fernández
- Fernando A. Flores, author of Death to the Bullshit Artists of South Texas, Vol.1 (2014)
- Gregory Thomas Garcia
- Julian S. Garcia
- Xavier Garza
- Diana Gabaldon
- Dagoberto Gilb
- Jennifer Givhan
- Rodolfo Gonzales
- Jovita González Mireles, author of Caballero: A Historical Novel
- Rigoberto González
- Stephanie Elizondo Griest
- José Ángel Gutiérrez
- Jaime Hernandez
- Juan Felipe Herrera
- Maria Hinojosa
- Rolando Hinojosa
- Arturo Islas
- Francisco Jiménez

== K-M ==
- Luis Leal, writer, author, and UCSB professor
- Alexis Madrigal, author of "Powering the Dream" (2010)
- Patricia Santos Marcantonio
- Al Martinez, Pulitzer Prize-nominated journalist; author of Ashes in the Rain: Selected Essays (1990)*
- Elizabeth Martínez, author of 500 Years of Chicano History in Pictures (1991)
- Rubén Martínez
- Bill Melendez
- Maria Cristina Mena
- Miguel Méndez
- Jim Mendiola
- Pat Mora
- Cherríe Moraga, co-author of This Bridge Called My Back: Writings by Radical Women of Color and author of A Xicana Codex of Changing Consciousness
- Alejandro Morales
- Angela Morales, author of The Girls in My Town (2016)
- Alejandro Murguía

== N-R ==
- Julian Nava
- Josefina Niggli
- Daniel Olivas,
- Miguel Antonio Otero
- Américo Paredes, author of With His Pistol in His Hand
- Joe Perez
- Cecile Piñeda
- Mary Helen Ponce
- Estela Portillo Trambley (1936–1998), receive the Quinto Sol Literary Prize.
- Adriana E. Ramírez, author of Dead Boys (2016)
- John Rechy
- Alberto Ríos
- Tomás Rivera, author of ...y no se lo tragó la tierra
- Luis J. Rodriguez
- Robert Rodriguez
- Richard Rodriguez
- María Amparo Ruiz de Burton
- Rudy Ruiz
- Pam Muñoz Ryan, author of Esperanza Rising

== S-Z ==
- Benjamin Alire Sáenz, author of Everything Begins and Ends at the Kentucky Club
- Floyd Salas
- Rubén Salazar
- Raúlrsalinas (Raúl R. Salinas), poet and author of Un trip through the mind jail y otras excursions (1980)
- Alex Sánchez
- Erika Sánchez, author and poet
- Ricardo Sánchez
- Ricardo Sanchez, author and United States Army general
- Hope Sandoval
- John Phillip Santos, author, journalist, and filmmaker
- Danzy Senna
- Shea Serrano
- Michelle Serros, author of Chicana Falsa and How to Be a Chicana Role Model.
- Adela Sloss Vento
- Roberto Solis
- Octavio Solis, award-winning playwright and director
- Gary Soto, author of Baseball in April: Stories and Buried Onions.
- Mario Suárez
- Luis Talamantez, poet and activist
- Jesús Salvador Treviño
- Marisela Treviño Orta
- Sergio Troncoso, author of The Last Tortilla and Other Stories, From This Wicked Patch of Dust and Crossing Borders: Personal Essays
- John Trudell, musician, author, poet and Political activist
- Sabine Ulibarrí
- Jorge Ulica (a.k.a. Julio G. Arce)
- Martin Guevara Urbina
- Luís Alberto Urrea, author of The Devil's Highway and Nobody's Son.
- Luis Valdez
- Richard Vasquez
- Robert Vasquez
- Félix Varela
- Alfredo Véa, Jr.
- Alma Luz Villanueva
- José Antonio Villarreal
- Victor Villaseñor
- Helena Maria Viramontes, author of Under the Feet of Jesus.
- Gwendolyn Zepeda

== See also ==
- Chicano literature
- Chicano poetry
- Multi-Ethnic Literature of the United States
- Before Columbus Foundation
