= Mexican-American literature =

Literature written by Mexican Americans in the United States

Mexican American literature is literature written by Mexican Americans in the United States. Although its origins can be traced back to the sixteenth century, the bulk of Mexican American literature dates from post-1848 and the United States annexation of large parts of Mexico in the wake of the Mexican–American War. Today, as a part of American literature in general, this genre includes a vibrant and diverse set of narratives, prompting critics to describe it as providing "a new awareness of the historical and cultural independence of both northern and southern American hemispheres". Chicano literature is an aspect of Mexican American literature.

== History ==
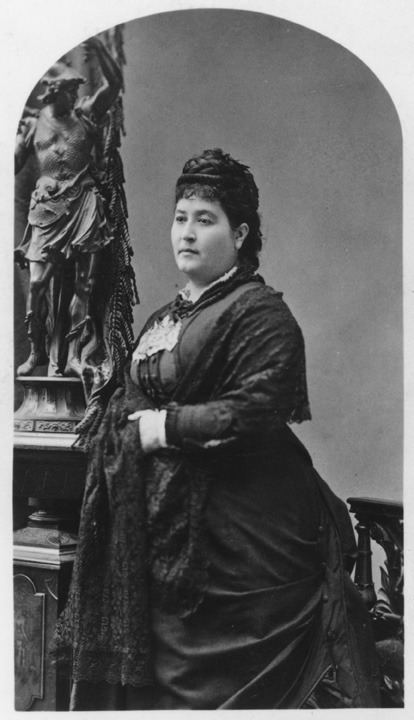
Maria Ruiz de Burton, the first Mexican American author in English.

Mexican Americans often adopted a dual culture in the 20th century; they speak English and adapt to U.S. culture, but are influenced by their Mexican heritage.

Some scholars argue that the origins of Mexican American literature can be traced back to the sixteenth century, starting with the chronicle written by Spanish adventurer Álvar Núñez Cabeza de Vaca, who published an account in 1542 of his long journey in what is now the U.S. Southwest, where he lived with various indigenous groups, learning their language and customs. Literary critics Harold Augenbraum and Margarite Fernández Olmos argue that Cabeza de Vaca's "metamorphosis into a being neither European nor Indian, a cultural hybrid created by the American experience, converts the explorer into a symbolic precursor of the Mexican American". Scholar Lee Dowling adds that Inca Garcilaso de la Vega also contributed to early Mexican American literature with his expeditionary work La Florida.

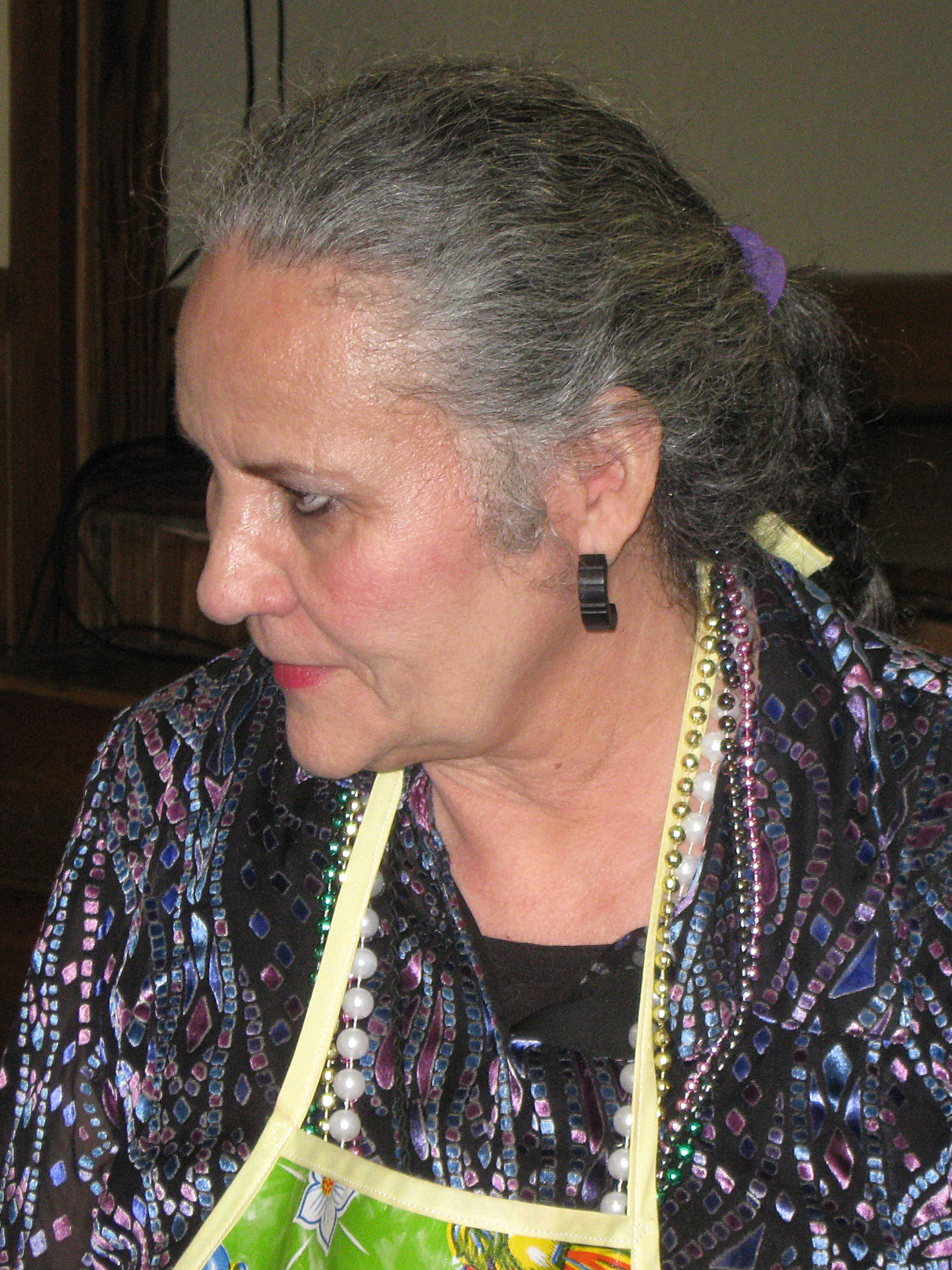
Denise Chávez a novelist and playwright whose works often focus on the experiences of Mexican-American women.

Mexican American literature (and, more generally, the Mexican American identity) is viewed as starting after the Mexican–American War and the subsequent 1848 Treaty of Guadalupe Hidalgo. In the treaty, Mexico ceded over half of its territory, the now the U.S. Southwest, including California, Nevada, Utah, and much of Arizona, Colorado, and New Mexico. Tens of thousands of former Mexican citizens became U.S. citizens. Literary critic Ramón Saldívar points out, "Unlike many other ethnic immigrants to the United States... but like the Native Americans, Mexican-Americans became an ethnic minority through the direct conquest of their homelands." This change in national citizenship was not immediately accompanied by a change in culture or language. Over time, however, these Mexican-Americans developed a unique culture that belonged fully neither to the U.S. nor to Mexico. In Saldívar's words, "Mexican-American culture after 1848 developed in the social interstices between Mexican and American cultural spheres, making that new cultural life patently a product of both but also different in decisive ways from each." The Hispanic culture of Mexican Americans, as expressed in literature as well as other cultural practices, has been further shaped by migrations of Mexicans to the U.S. throughout subsequent eras.

María Ruiz de Burton is considered to be the first Mexican American author and the first Mexican American author to write in English.

By 1900, according to critic Raymund Paredes, "Mexican American literature had emerged as a distinctive part of the literary culture of the United States." Paredes highlights the significance of Josephina Niggli's 1945 novel, Mexican Village, which was "the first literary work by a Mexican American to reach a general American audience." Many different genres of Mexican American literature, including narrative, poetry, and drama, now have a wide popular and critical presence.

== Definition and dynamics ==
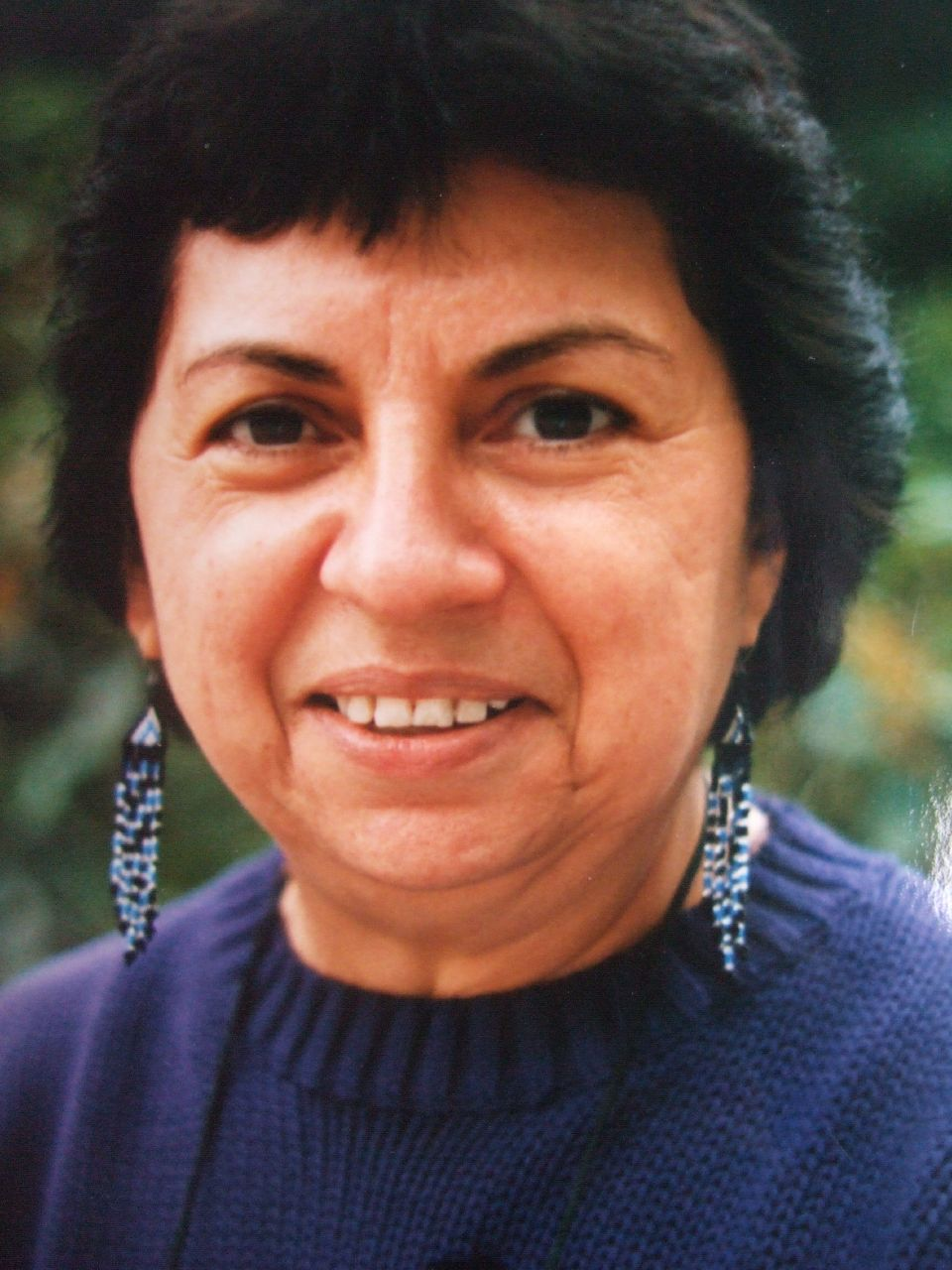
Gloria Anzaldúa a scholar, poet, and essayist whose work, including "Borderlands/La Frontera," explores the intersection of cultures, languages, and identities.

The definition of Mexican American encompasses both Mexicans who have moved to the United States and U.S.-born people of Mexican ancestry. The latter group includes Hispano populations who have lived in Texas, New Mexico, Arizona, and parts of California since before the United States annexed these areas and who lived different experiences than those south of the annexation line. Composed mostly of Spanish-speaking Catholics living in a predominantly English-speaking Protestant country, Mexican Americans have had the status of a linguistic and cultural minority.

Mexican American literature also has a racial dynamic; most Mexican-Americans define themselves as mestizo, people with a mixture of primarily indigenous Mexican and European heritage, while others fit within the more White demographics of people with primarily European heritage. There are also people who do not fit easily in these definitions, such as Josefina Niggli, whose parents were Anglo Americans living in Mexico when she was born.

Felipe de Ortego y Gasca offers an alternative perspective on Mexican American literature in Backgrounds of Mexican-American Literature, the first study in the field of Mexican-American literary history.

== Themes ==
Mexican American literature focuses on many themes including history, linguistics, poetry, Hispanic culture, identity on either side of the border, politics, fantasy, and regional culture.

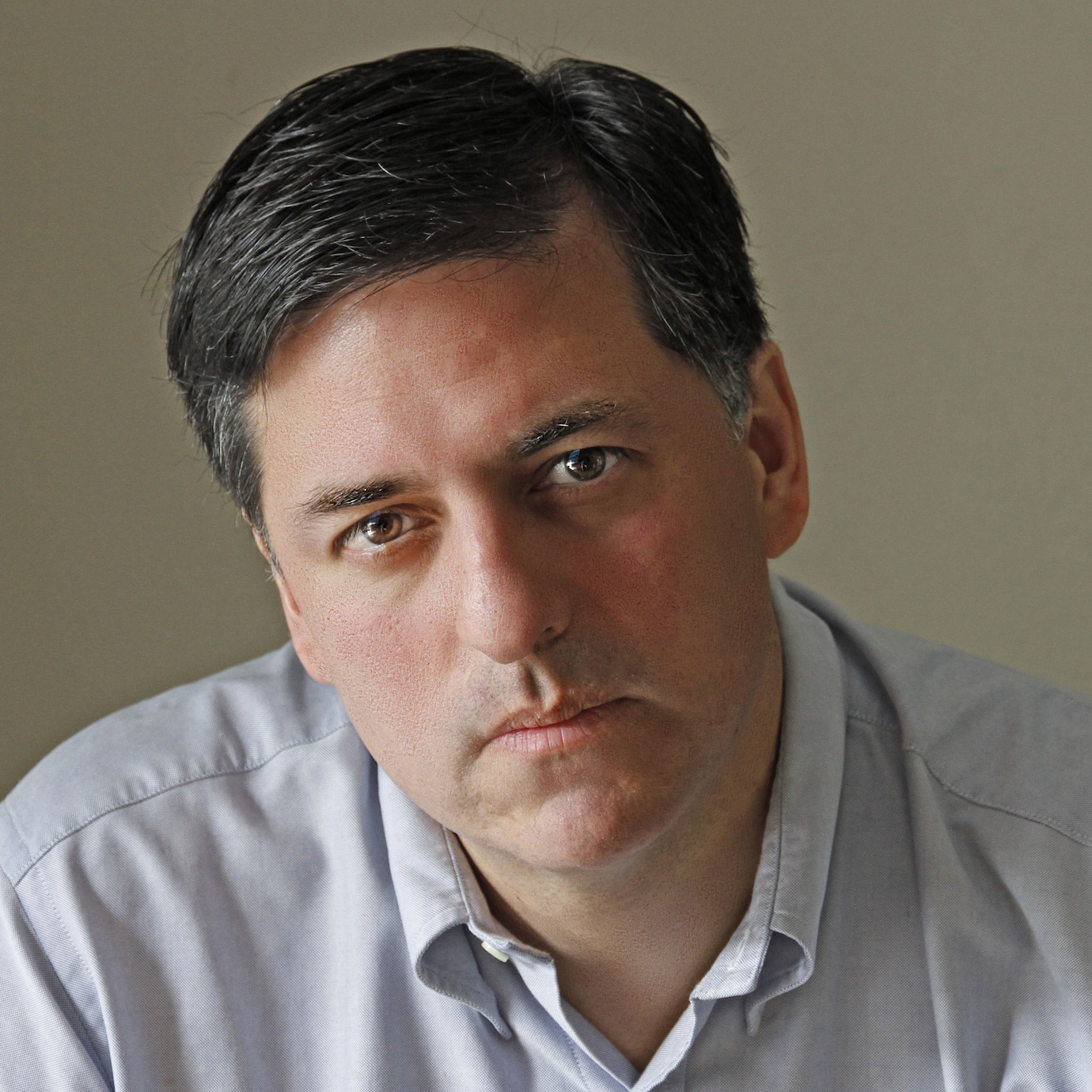
Sergio Troncoso writes about crossing cultural, religious, and psychological borders.

Other notable themes include the experience of migration and living between two languages. Mexican American literature may be written in either English or Spanish or even a combination of the two often referred to as Spanglish.

=== Border literature ===
Traveling across the border is becoming an important topic as the Mexican population is growing in regions close to the border, such as Texas and California. Mexican migration to the U.S. is causing an increase in literature for labor workers and studies of the Mexican-American Culture. The motivational force of Mexicans traveling across the border is viewed as an opportunity to increase their capital and expand their opportunities. Mexican-Americans near the border struggle with their identity because they are mostly considered immigrants, although some may be U.S. citizens. Mexicans view crossing the border as an opportunity to improve their living conditions for themselves and their families although they have had a strong bond to their Mexican nationality and some Mexicans, with negative national memories of the Mexican American War, would look at those that became U.S. citizens as traitors.

Helena Maria Viramontes whose works, including "Under the Feet of Jesus," address social issues.

Before the 1930s, many Mexicans would stay in their homeland and not seek the U.S. as an escape. After the U.S.-Mexican war, Mexicans saw themselves as being denied their civil rights while having U.S. citizenship; they found themselves receiving much lower pay than White labor who disregarded their skill level.

=== Dual-cultural identity ===
Author Stephanie Elizondo Griest takes a neutral standpoint where she is acting as a third person in her books. She explores what it's like to have a Mexican culture in an American society. Even though Mexican Americans are bound to the Mexican culture, it seems as if they are distant from Mexico itself because of the U.S.-Mexico border, thus creating a mixture of culture for the people of the region with both U.S. and Mexican culture. Mexican culture is known for being mixed. Mexicans living near the border keep their cultural identity because they live close to Mexico despite being blocked by the U.S.-Mexico border. Another factor that helps Mexican culture endure in the U.S. is people migrating from Mexico to the U.S. and bringing their culture with them, as well as influencing family members. Their culture is thought to be assimilated by later generations of immigrants to the U.S., but younger generations develop an interest in their cultural roots. People born in the U.S. to immigrant parents face an assimilation process where they try to adapt to their communities, but still feel like they're considered foreign.

== Major and notable figures ==
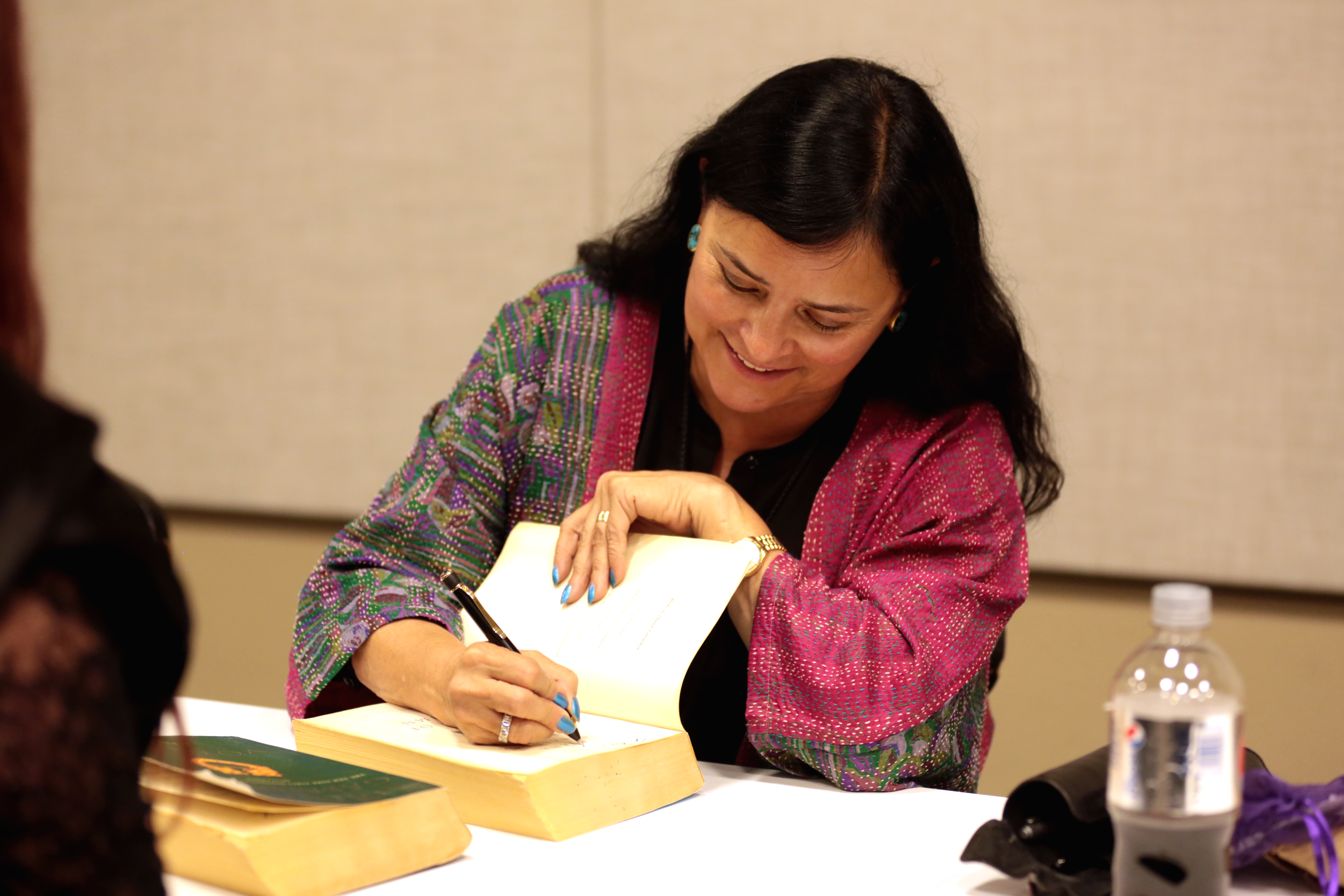
Diana Gabaldon signing books at the 2017 Phoenix Comicon

Major or notable figures in Mexican American literature include: María Ruiz de Burton, Adela Sloss Vento, Sabine R. Ulibarri, Jovita González, Maria Cristina Mena, Francisco Jiménez, Américo Paredes, Adina Emilia De Zavala, Ron Arias, Rafael C. Castillo, Gary Soto, John Rechy, Denise Chavez, Daniel Olivas, Pat Mora, Benjamin Alire Sáenz, Victor Villaseñor, Tomás Rivera, Luis Alberto Urrea, Sergio Troncoso, Rolando Hinojosa-Smith, Kathleen Alcalá, Rudy Ruiz, Jimmy Santiago Baca, Lucha Corpi, and Leroy Quintana.

== Chicano movement and literature ==
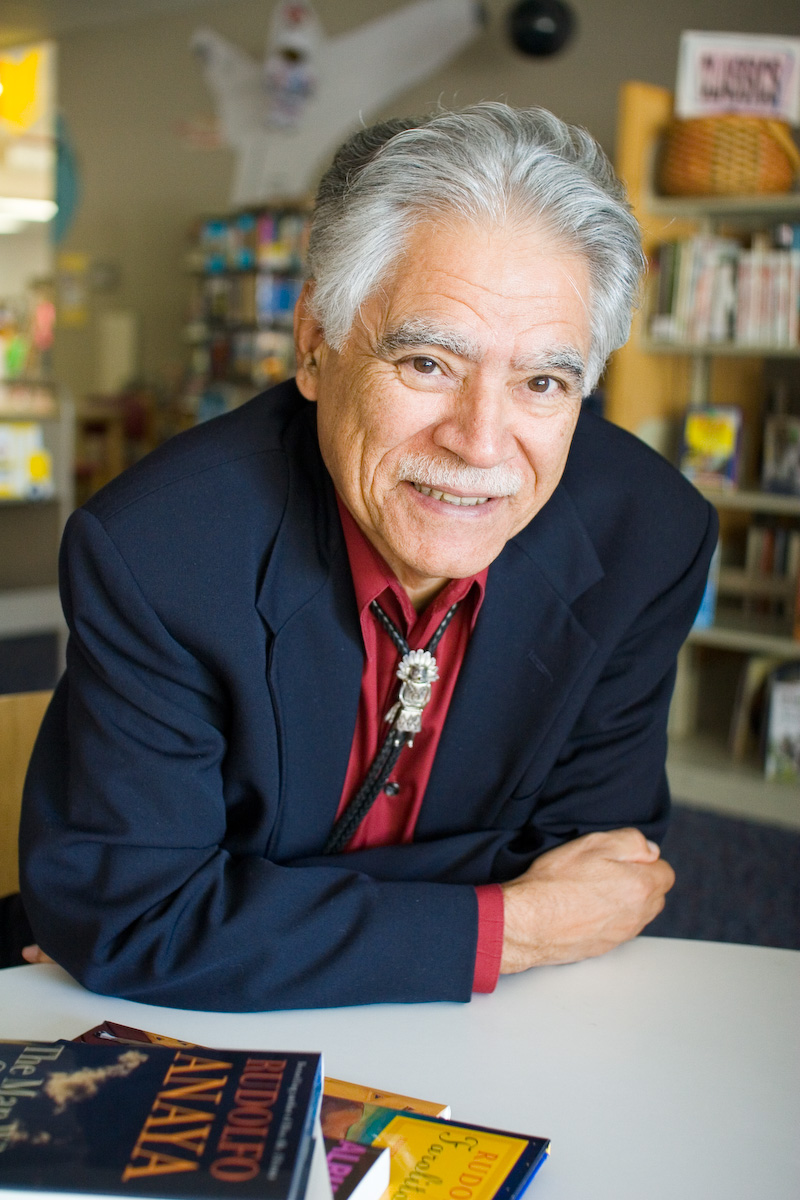
Rudolfo Anaya, Mexican American author, educator born in 1937 in Pantura, New Mexico and published Bless Me Ultima in 1972, which's adapted to film in 2013.

"Chicano" is a label or chosen identity that a portion of Mexican Americans identify with and refers to a person of Mexican descent in North America. It was born out of the Chicano movement of the 1970’s. Many Mexican Americans and Chicanos celebrate their cultural roots, including historical practices such as the Day of the Dead.

Chicano literature tends to focus on themes of identity, discrimination, and border culture, with an emphasis on validating Mexican-American or Chicano culture in the United States. It is often associated with the social justice and cultural claims of the Chicano movement. Some Mexican Americans had been targeted racially since 1848 and many had often responded by rejecting the label "brown" throughout history when being "white" was more American.

Chicano writing includes those works in which writers' sense of ethnic identity or chicanismo animates their work fundamentally, often through the presentation of Chicano characters, cultural situations, and speech patterns. Chicano culture has often been politically focused on the question of the border, and how Chicanos straddle or cross that border. There is also a large amount of Chicano poetry.

The literature on Chicano history can be found in Occupied America, by Rodolfo Acuña, which offers an alternative perspective of history from the Chicano point of view.

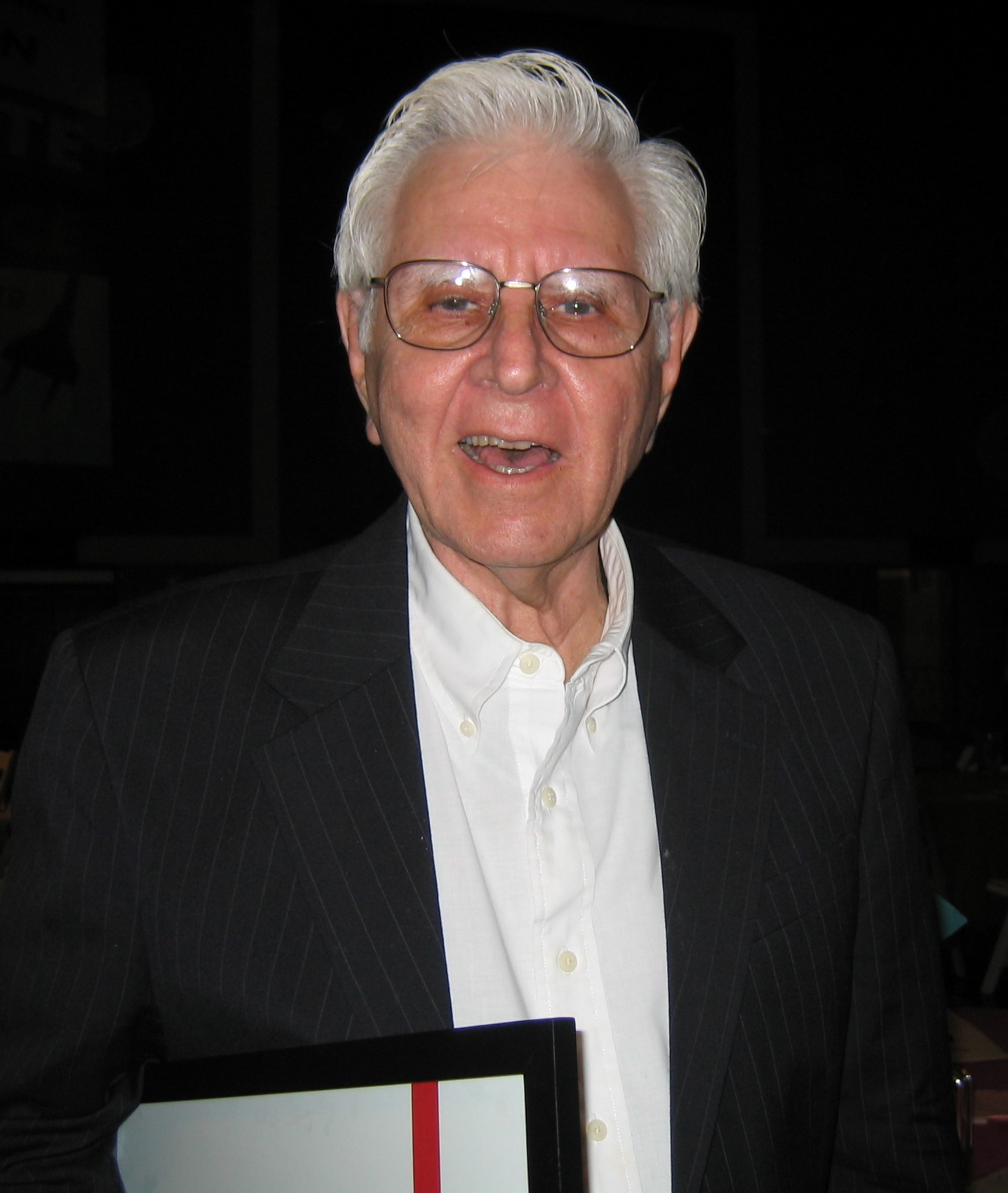
Rodolfo Acuña an American historian, professor emeritus at California State University, Northridge, and a scholar of Chicano studies.

Con Safos Magazine is an independent Chicano literary journal first published in Los Angeles between 1968 and 1972, and then revived in 1995.

Historically, literature has faced gender gaps, and Chicano literature is no exception, with more male writers recorded than women. "Machismo", a sense of overt masculinity, is often cited as part of the reason that Chicana voices have historically been silenced. During El Movimiento, in which Chicanos were fighting for social and civil rights in the United States, several Chicana writers began to write, forming an important part of the movement.

The contributions of feminists such as Gloria Anzaldúa and Cherríe Moraga have been particularly pronounced over the past couple of decades. Anzaldúa, in particular, brought more attention to view the topic of the border in ways beyond the physical. Her focus primarily dealt with sexual and cultural oppression, while Moraga made significant contributions to addressing queer and lesbian identities among Chicano/a people.

There are many notable Chicano authors, such as Gloria Anzaldúa, Ana Castillo, Carlos Muñoz, Jr., Rudolfo Anaya, Rodolfo Gonzales, Sandra Cisneros, Julian S. Garcia, Oscar Zeta Acosta, Luis Valdez, Luis Omar Salinas, Tino Villanueva, Lorna Dee Cervantes, Rigoberto González, Luis J. Rodriguez, Alicia Gaspar de Alba and Cherrie Moraga.

== Chica lit ==
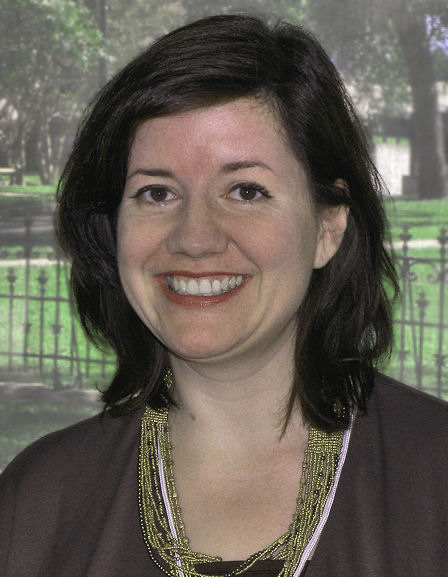
Gwendolyn Zepeda Houston's first Poet Laureate

In 2003, author Alisa Valdes-Rodriguez published The Dirty Girls Social Club, a chick lit novel aimed at Latina women. Valdes-Rodriguez was dubbed the godmother of Chica lit by Seattle Times magazine. Unlike other works of Mexican American literature, Chica lit targeted middle-class women like Valdes-Rodriguez, who described herself as "an Ivy League graduate, middle-class person who just lives a regular American life—you know, born and raised here, don't speak all that much Spanish". Michele Serros was a Latina writer drawing on her own life experiences, much of her works gave voice to the complexities of lives straddling two worlds: working-class Mexican-American heritage and southern California pop culture. She described how she never quite fit in through poems and prose that were both poignant and hilarious. Pam Muñoz Ryan has written over forty books for young people, including picture books, early readers, and middle grade and young adult novels. Her novel Esperanza Rising was commissioned as a play by the Minneapolis Children's Theatre and has been performed in venues around the US including the Goodman Theatre in Chicago, and the Cutler Majestic Theatre in Boston. Angela Morales Her essay "The Girls in My Town" appeared in The Best American Essays, 2013, edited by Cheryl Strayed, and her essay "Bloodyfeathers, R.I.P." appeared as notable essay in Best American Essays 2015.
