= Joseph Perez =

Joe or Joseph Perez may refer to:

- Joseph Pérez (1931–2020), French historian
- Joe Perez (writer) (born 1969), American author of books on spiritual development
- Joseph Patrick Pérez (born 1997), American soccer player
- Joe Perez (baseball) (born 1999), American third baseman
- Joe Perez (rugby union) (born 1993), Samoan rugby player

== See also ==
- Joseph Pérès (1890–1962), French mathematician
