= Roberta Fernández =

American novelist

- Education: University of Texas at Austin (BA, MA); University of California, Berkeley (PhD)
- Occupation: Novelist
- Writing career
- Period: 1990–present
- Genres: Composite novel, short story cycle
- Notable work: Intaglio: A Novel in Six Stories
- Notable awards: Multicultural Publisher's Exchange, Best Fiction (1991); Texas Institute of Letters

Roberta Fernández is a Tejana novelist, scholar, critic and arts advocate. She is known for her novel Intaglio and for her work editing several award-winning women writers. She was a professor in Romance languages & literatures and women's studies at the University of Georgia.

== Biography ==
=== Early life and education ===
Fernández is a fifth-generation tejana from Laredo, Texas. She earned her B.A. and an M.A. degrees at the University of Texas at Austin and her PhD in Romance Languages & Literatures from the University of California, Berkeley. Her dissertation, "Towards a Contextualization of José Carlos Mariátegui's Concept of Literary and Cultural Nationalism," examined the role of José Carlos Mariátegui in the early 20th century Peruvian cultural wars.

Fernandez held a post-doctoral fellowship at the Center for Mexican American Studies at UT Austin. She received a Rockefeller Fellowship from the Womanist Consortium of the Institute of African American Studies at University of Georgia to study Chicana literary feminism and nationalism. She received a second Rockefeller Fellowship from the CRIM (Centro Regional de Investigacion Multidisciplinarias), a research center in Cuernavaca associated with the National University of Mexico. The seminar topic for 2005 was "The Empowerment of Women." Her own topic dealt with "The Role Played by Community-Based Organizations in the Transculturation Process & Empowerment of Mexican Women Recently Arrived in Georgia."

=== Art advocacy ===
- Assistant to the Director, Mexican Museum in San Francisco
- Director, Bilingual Arts Program, Oakland Unified School District
- Founder, Prisma: A Multicultural, Multilingual Women's Literary Review (1979–1982) at Mills College
- Directed two major conferences: "The Cultural Roots of Chicana Literature, 1780-1980" (Mills College and Aztlán Cultural, 1981; see here for photo of the exhibit's poster) and "Latinos in the United States: Cultural Roots and Diversity" (Brown University and Casa Puerto Rico, 1985).

=== Editorial and curatorial work ===
- Editor, Arte Público Press, from 1990 to 1994. Several of the writers whose manuscripts she edited received national awards for these works.
- Curator, "Twenty-Five Years of Hispanic Literature of the United States, 1965-1990" (traveling exhibit), sponsored by the Texas Humanities Resource Center.

== Published works ==
- An Autobiography of an Abused Child
- Intaglio: A Novel in Six Stories (1990)
- Fronterizas: Una novela en seis cuentos (the author's own re-write into Spanish of Intaglio) (2002)
- In Other Words: Literature by Latinas of the United States, ed. (1994; anthology)
- Fiesta, Fe y Cultura: Religious Celebrations of the Mexican Community of Detroit, [Roberta Fernandez, Spanish editor and translator], Laurie Sommers, ed. (1995)
- Twenty-five Years of Hispanic Literature in the United States, (a catalogue of a library exhibit of the same name) at the Main Library of the U of Houston, 2 November 1992 – 14 January 1993).
- Some of her short fiction and essays have appeared in Riding Low in the Streets of Gold, Judith Ortiz Cofer, ed.; Herencia: The Anthology of Hispanic Literature of the United States, Nicolas Kanellos, ed.; American 24-Karet Gold: Classic American Short Stories, Yvonne Colliud Sisko, ed.; Breve: Actualite de la Nouvelle (Paris), Martine Couderc, ed. & trans.; Barrios and Borderlands: Cultures of Latinos and Latinas in the United States, Denis Lynn Daly Heyck, ed.; Mascaras: Latina Writers on Their Own Work, Lucha Corpi, ed.; The Stories We Have Kept Secret, Carol Bruchac, ed.;The Massachusetts Review (Spring 1983); Cuentos: Stories by Latinas, Gomez, Moraga, Romo-Carmona, eds., and many more national and international publications.
- Some of her scholarly articles have appeared in as The Routledge Companion to Latino/a Literature, Frances Aparicio & Suzanne Bost, eds. (2012); The Flannery O'Connor Review (Fall, 2009); Encyclopedia of Ethnic American Literature, Emmanuel Nelson, gen. ed. (2006); 'Abriendo Caminos in the Brotherland: Chicana Feminism in El Grito ' in Chicana Leadership: The Frontier Reader, Sue Armitage et al., eds. (2002); 'La presencia de Jose Carlos Mariategui en el Repertorio Americano (Costa Rica, 1919–1959)' in Revista de Linguística y Filología de la Universidad de Costa Rica; Reconstructing American Literature, Paul Lauter (ed.); Women's Studies and in other publications.

== Awards for creative writing ==
- Three-time DeWitt Wallace/Reader's Digest/MacDowell Fellow while a resident at the MacDowell Colony
- Multicultural Publisher's Exchange award, Best Fiction (1991), Intaglio: A Novel in Six Stories
- Inducted into the Texas Institute of Letters (1991)
- Finalist for the Schweitzer Fellowship in Creative Writing at SUNY Albany—Toni Morrison, judge, 1987
- Finalist for the D.H. Lawrence Fellowship at the U of New Mexico, 1986
- Finalist for the Dobie/Paisano Fellowship of the Graduate School at the University of Texas in Austin, 1983

== Scholarly awards ==
- Fulbright Senior Lecturer award: Department of English and American Studies at Charles University in Prague, Czech Republic (2006–2007)
- Scholar-in-Residence (by invitation of the Athens-Clarke County Public Library): led five book discussions on Latino/a literature at four public libraries in Georgia through a pilot program sponsored by the National Endowment for the Humanities and the American Library Association, Oct 2001-June 2002
- Faculty Research Grant, Center for Humanities and Arts, University of Georgia, Spring, 2001

== See also ==
- List of Mexican-American writers
- Mexican American literature

== Notes/Further reading ==
- Gómez-Vega, Ibis. "La mujer como artista en Intaglio." The Bilingual Review/La Revista Bilingue, 1993 Jan-Apr; 18 (1): 14–22.
- Kelley, Margot. "A Minor Revolution: Chicano/a Composite Novels and the Limits of Genre." Ethnicity and the American Short Story. Ed. Julia Brown. New York, NY: Garland; 1997. pp. 63–84.
- Muthyala, John Sumanth. "Roberta Fernández's Intaglio: Border Crossings and Mestiza Feminism in the Borderlands." Canadian Review of American Studies/Revue Canadienne d'Etudes Américaines, 2000; 30 (1): 92–110. (PDF online)
