= In Other Words =

In Other Words may refer to:

== Books ==
- In Other Words, a book by Mona Baker
- In Other Words, a book by Roberta Fernández
- In Other Words, a book by John Crowley
- In Other Words, a book by Jhumpa Lahiri
- In Other Words, a poetry collection by May Swenson

== Music ==
- In Other Words, a 2008 album by Ian Pooley
- In Other Words, a 2017 album by Paper Tiger
- "In Other Words", a song better known as "Fly Me to the Moon"
- "In Other Words", a song by Ed Sheeran from Play, 2025

== See also ==
- In Other Words Feminist Community Center
