= Jesús Salvador Treviño =

American film director

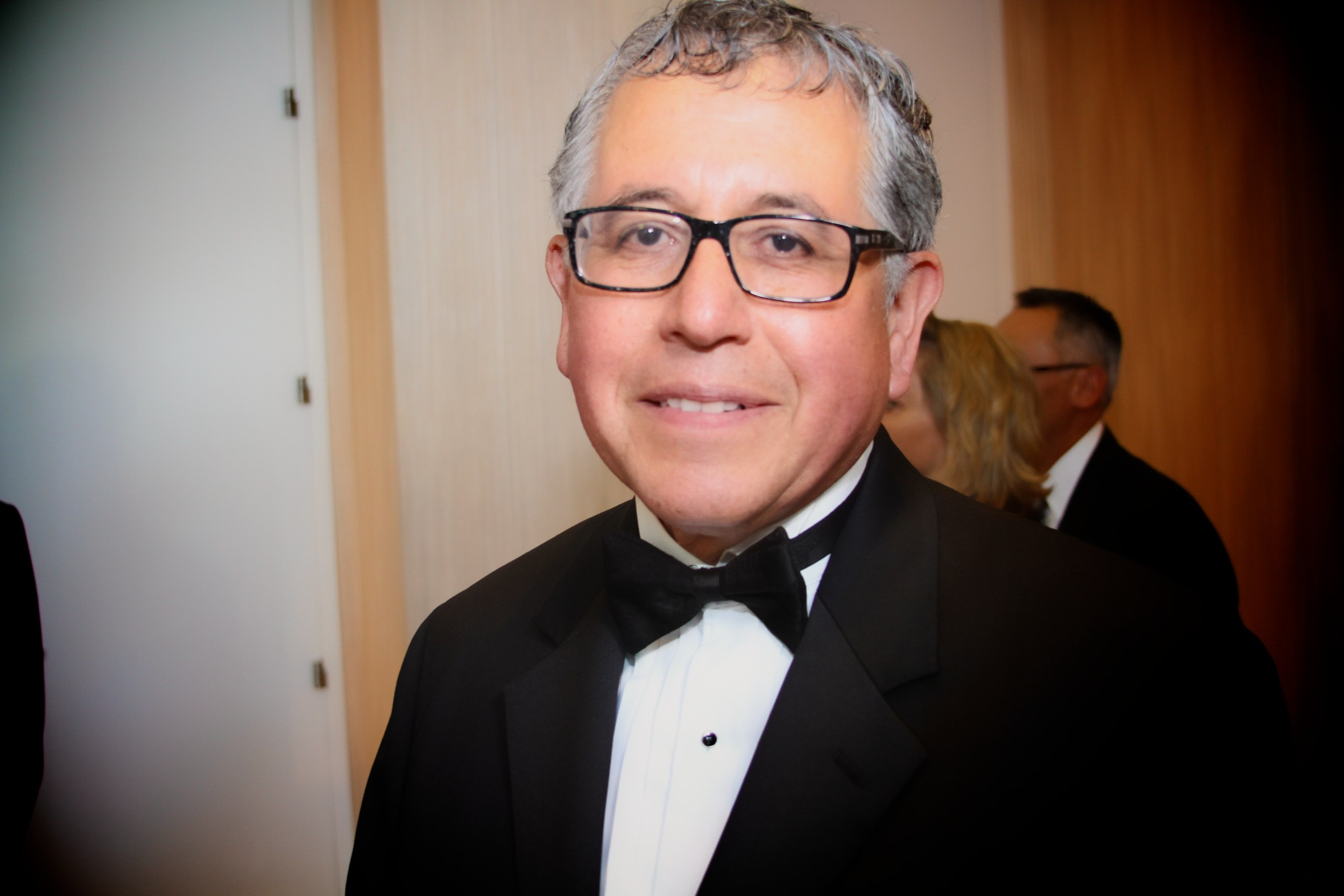
- Treviño at the 2013 Imagen Awards
- Born: March 26, 1946 (age 79); El Paso, Texas, U.S.
- Other names: Jesus Salvador Trevino, Jesus Trevino, Jesus Travino, Jesus Treviño, Jesús S. Treviño, Jesús Treviño
- Occupations: Film director, television director
- Years active: 1980–present

Jesús Salvador Treviño (born March 26, 1946, in El Paso, Texas) is an American television director of Mexican descent.

He is alternatively credited under a number of names: Jesus Salvador Trevino, Jesus Trevino, Jesus Travino, Jesus Treviño, Jesús S. Treviño and Jesús Treviño.

== Early career ==
Jesús Treviño began his career in film and television as a student activist documenting the 1960s Chicano civil rights struggle with a super-8 camera. Throughout the late sixties and early seventies, he was both a participant in and a chronicler of the events and issues of that time.

His national PBS documentaries about Latinos and the Chicano struggle include Chicano Moratorium Aftermath (1970), The Salazar Inquest (1970), América Tropical (1971), Yo Soy Chicano (1972), La Raza Unida (1972) and Birthwrite (1979).

He wrote and directed the Mexican feature film Raíces de sangre (Roots of Blood) (1979) and Seguín (1982), an American Playhouse drama of the Alamo saga told from a Mexican American point of view.

== Director ==
As a Hollywood director, Treviño has directed a number of episodes from the television series Resurrection Blvd., Babylon 5, Bones, Star Trek: Voyager, seaQuest DSV, Crossing Jordan, Third Watch and Star Trek: Deep Space Nine.

He has directed two films, a feature and a documentary respectively, Raices de Sangre (Roots of Blood) (1978) and One Out of Ten (1979). Upon finishing Raices, Treviño received funding from the National Endowment for the Humanities for a multi-part series on Chicano history, La Historia, which was eventually halted due to defunding upon the opening years of the Reagan administration. However, one section written by Treviño himself, Seguin, survived and was released as a stand-alone film by KCET—PBS, directed by Treviño, as part of the American Playhouse drama series in 1982. He has also directed episodes from over thirty other series, including Criminal Minds, Prison Break, The O.C., ER, Law & Order: Criminal Intent, Dawson's Creek, Chicago Hope and NYPD Blue.

Treviño is a member of the Directors Guild of America (DGA) and served on its National Board during the 2009–2011 term as a board member. As of 2015, he serves as an Alternate Board Member. He was co-founder of the DGA Latino Committee and has also served on the Western Council of Directors and on the DGA Negotiating Committee in 2004, 2007, 2011 and 2014. He was honored with a Lifetime Tribute at the DGA in 2009.

== Other activities ==
Treviño is an author. His memoir Eyewitness: A Filmmaker's Memoir of the Chicano Movement (Hispanic Civil Rights) was published in 2001. The book chronicles his experiences as an activist filmmaker during the turbulent 1960s and also addresses the status of United States Latinos in the year 2000 and beyond.

His short story collections include The Fabulous Sinkhole and Other Stories (1995), The Skyscraper That Flew (2005) and Return to Arroyo Grande (2015).

All of his books have been published by Arte Público Press, a publisher that also makes their titles available direct online.

As a producer, he co-executive produced the PBS documentary series, Chicano! History of the Mexican American Civil Rights Movement (1997) and the Showtime series, Resurrection Blvd. (2000–2003).

Treviño is founder and publisher of the website latinopia.com. Latinopia is a video-oriented website on Chicano/Latino history, art, literature, music, theater, cinema and food.

== Awards ==
Treviño has won dozens of national and international awards and recognition. Among awards of note, he won two DGA awards for Outstanding Directorial Achievement in Dramatic Shows – Daytime for CBS Schoolbreak Special episode "Gangs (#5.4)" and for Lifestories: Families in Crisis episode "Power: The Eddie Matos Story". In 2002, he won two ALMA awards, one for Outstanding Director of a Television Drama or Comedy for episode "Adam 553" of series Third Watch (not to be confused with the TV movie Thirdspace, which he also directed), and an ALMA as Co-Executive Producer of Resurrection Blvd. for Outstanding Television Series.

In 1991, his film, Raíces de Sangre (Roots of Blood), was included in an anthology of the 25 Most Significant Films of Latin American Cinema at the 36th Annual International Film Festival of Valladolid, Spain. In 1993, he was honored with an homage at the Montevideo International Film Festival in Montevideo, Uruguay.

== See also ==
- American Mexican
- Chicanismo
- Chicano Moratorium
- History of Mexican Americans
- Hyphenated American
- List of Mexican Americans
- List of Mexican American writers
- Melting pot, metaphor for cultural fusion
- Television producer
