= Nash Candelaria =

American novelist

- Born: May 7, 1928; Los Angeles, California, U.S.
- Died: January 5, 2016 (aged 87); Santa Fe, New Mexico, U.S.
- Occupation: Novelist
- Writing career
- Period: 1977–2010
- Genres: novel, short story
- Notable works: Memories of the Alhambra (1977); Not By the Sword (1982)
- Notable awards: American Book Award

Nash Candelaria (May 7, 1928 – January 5, 2016) was an American novelist. He was known for a tetralogy of novels about the Rafa family. He has been called the "historical novelist of the Hispanic people of New Mexico."

== Biography ==
=== Early life ===
Candelaria was born in Los Angeles to a Mexican American family, but his family can trace its lineage back to the first settlers of New Mexico and to the founders of Albuquerque. Candelaria has always considered New Mexico his home and, in addition to moving there permanently as an adult, has set many of his stories there. He grew up in Los Angeles, attending local schools and graduating from UCLA with a degree in chemistry. Continuing his education at night, he took courses in short story writing at Los Angeles City College, playwrighting at USC, and television writing at UCLA. His short story teacher, Edna Vann, had a Hollywood background, working as a script editor and secretary for Alfred Hitchcock. His playwrighting teacher was William DeMille, brother of Hollywood director, Cecil B. DeMille. The only science course he took was microbiology at USC. But science was not to be his life's endeavor. He found it confining and lacking in what stirred his emotions. It was the creative writing courses that excited him. After four years working as a research chemist for a pharmaceutical company in Glendale, California he resigned his job, obtained a commission in the Air Force (1952) with the intent of pursuing a career as a writer after military service during the Korean War. (He had been exempt from the draft because of his job. Among the projects he worked on was a blood plasma substitute, of potential value to the military.)

=== Early career ===
His Air Force time was spent mostly as an officer training in ground electronics (radar) at Keesler Air Base in Biloxi, Mississippi. The Korean War ended about the time he finished the course and, like most of his fellow young officers he opted to be released from active duty, remaining in the Air Force reserve. He had applied and been accepted in the writing program at the University of Iowa but decided to return to Los Angeles and seek work as a writer. During this time he worked as an editor for a research organization designing nuclear reactors for producing electrical power. Shortly he moved to a job as a technical writer about chemical laboratory instruments for a prominent company in the new industry. Soon he transferred to the company's advertising department. Here his chemical training and writing aspirations came together although his first love was fiction. From here he pursued his day job in scientific advertising with various other companies, all the while trying to write fiction. He married in 1955 and subsequently fathered two sons while working at his day job and writing fiction in his spare time.

=== The Rafa family quartet ===
Memories of the Alhambra, the first of the Rafa novels, is considered one of the seminal novels of Chicano literature. It tells the story of a middle-class family who moves from Albuquerque to Los Angeles in search of the American Dream. It follows two generations of the Rafa family, focusing on José, whose family has been in New Mexico since Albuquerque was founded in 1706, and his son, Joe. José's interest in finding his roots takes him to both Mexico and Spain. As one critic describes the novel, it

exemplifies the familiar themes that have preoccupied Chicano writers: the dilemma of who they are and where they are going. [... José's] quest is unfruitful, however, since José discovers that a man must be judged by what he is in the present, not by what he might have been in the past.

"Not by the Sword" takes the Rafa family back to the time of the Mexican War, 1846–1848. when the Rafas of New Mexico became Americans by conquest. One reviewer described it as taboo, a story often ignored about American Manifest Destiny. "Inheritance of Strangers" is in essence a sequel to "Sword." It is some years later (1890) when New Mexico has become Americanized during the time of the coming of the railroad and of "Anglos" from back East. "Leonor Park" takes place prior to the Great Depression of 1930. It is the story of a battle for land full of greed, intrigue, and skullduggery.

== Marriage and children ==
In 1955 Nash Candelaria married Doranne Godwin, an actress and videographer. They celebrated their 50th wedding anniversary in 2005. They have two sons, both musicians, making for an artistic family. Doranne, born in Tallahassee, Florida, is of English-Irish descent. They met when both worked for an analytical instrument company in Fullerton, California. Now in retirement, they both work full-time on their artistic endeavors.

== Philosophical and/or political views ==
Although Candelaria's career coincides with the Chicano cultural renaissance, he resists being classified as simply a "Chicano writer." As he describes his work:

I don't see my writing as a political instrument. I don't belong to the Chicano Movement. My current writing is on Chicano subjects, but I have written on other themes and probably will in the future.

== Published works ==
- Memories of the Alhambra novel (1977)
- Not By the Sword novel (1982)
- Inheritance of Strangers novel (1985)
- The Day the Cisco Kid Shot John Wayne story collection (1988)
- Leonor Park novel (1991)
- "John Wayne, Person and Persona: The love affairs of an American legend," Hopscotch: A Cultural Review 2.4 (2001) 2–13
- Uncivil Rights and Other Stories (1998)
- A Daughter's a Daughter novel (2008)
- Second Communion memoir (2010)

== Awards ==
- American Book Award for Not by the Sword
- Finalist, Western Writers of America's Best Western Historical Novel award for Not by the Sword
- Finalist, Western Writers of America's Best Western Short Fiction for "The Dancing School"
- Finalist, PEN Southwest Fiction Award for the novel A Daughter's a Daughter
- Honorable Mention, International Latino Book Awards for the memoir "Second Communion"
- Finalist, PEN Southwest Fiction award for the novel "A Daughter's a Daughter

== See also ==
- List of Mexican American writers
- Chicano studies

== Notes/Further reading ==
- Heiner Bus, Universität Bamberg. "Nash Candelaria." The Literary Encyclopedia. 30 Jun. 2002. The Literary Dictionary Company. accessed 11 March 2008.
- Leal, Luis. "La actitud revisionista en la literatura chicana: La trilogía de Nash Candelaria" Bilingual Review/La Revista Bilingüe, 1996 Jan-Apr; 21 (1): 24–32.
- Lee, A. Robert. "Chicanismo as Memory: The Fictions of Rudolfo Anaya, Nash Candelaria, Sandra Cisneros, and Ron Arias" pp. 320–39 IN: Singh, Amritjit (ed.); Skerrett, Joseph T. Jr. (ed.); Hogan, Robert E.; Memory and Cultural Politics: New Approaches to American Ethnic Literatures. Boston: Northeastern UP; 1996.
- Bus, Heiner. "The Power of Stereotypes: Spain in Herman Melville's Benito Cereno (1855) and Nash Candelaria's Memories of the Alhambra (1977)" pp. 193–206 IN: Hebel, Udo J. (ed. and note); Ortseifen, Karl (ed. and note); Transatlantic Encounters: Studies in European-American Relations. Trier, Germany: Wissenschaftlicher; 1995.
- Beltrán-Vocal, María A. "Soledad, aislamiento y búsqueda de identidad en Nash Candelaria y Juan Goytisolo" The Americas Review: A Review of Hispanic Literature and Art of the USA, 1993 Spring; 21 (1): 103–11.
- Durruty, Suzanne. "L'Itinéraire de la famille Rafas dans Memories of the Alhambra de Nash Candelaria" pp. 143–152 IN: Béranger, Jean (ed.); Cazemajou, Jean (ed.); Lacroix, Jean-Michel (ed.); Spriet, Pierre (ed.); Multilinguisme et muliculturalisme en Amérique du Nord. Bordeaux: Marillier; 1990.
- Shirley, Paula W. "Nash Candelaria (7 May 1928 - )" pp. 68–73 IN: Lomelí, Francisco A. (ed. and preface); Shirley, Carl R. (ed. and preface); Leal, Luis (foreword); Chicano Writers: First Series. Detroit, MI: Gale; 1989.
- Bruce-Novoa, [Juan?]. "Nash Candelaria, novelista" Plural: Revista Cultural de Excelsior, 1987 Aug.; 191: 41–47.
