= Roots of Blood =

1978 film by Jesús Salvador Treviño

- DVD cover for Raíces de sangre in English
- Raíces de sangre
- Directed by: Jesús Salvador Treviño
- Written by: Jesús Salvador Treviño
- Starring: Richard Yñiguez; Malena Doria; Adriana Rojo; Ernesto Gómez Cruz; Pepe Serna; Roxana Bonila-Giannini
- Cinematography: Rosalío Solano
- Edited by: Joaquin Ceballos
- Music by: Sergio Guerrero
- Production company: CONACINE (Corporación Nacional Cinematográfica)
- Distributed by: Azteca Films (foreign theatrical distributor); Madera CineVideo (VHS tape); Spanishmultimedia (DVD)
- Release date: 1978 (Mexico/International)
- Running time: 94 minutes
- Country: Mexico
- Language: Spanish (also English on DVD)

Raíces de sangre (Spanish pronunciation: [raˈises de ˈsaŋɡɾe]) (Roots of Blood) is a Mexican movie written and directed by Jesús Salvador Treviño released in 1978 in Mexico and other countries. According to some sources, it had a wide release on May 30, 1979, but other sources show it was playing in US theaters as early as August 1978.

The film deals with labor relations and tensions between Mexican and Chicano workers. It has received praise as a foundational work in Latin American cinema.

== Theme, setting, tone and plot summary ==
The theme concerns worker relations along the US–Mexico border.

The movie is set in Socorro, Texas, along the border between Mexico and the US. Chicano and Mexican workers interact with each other and with management in a garment factory.

Amidst a heightening labor tension and attempts at organizing the workers, a deadly riot occurs.

== Cast ==
- Richard Yñiguez as Carlos Rivera
- Malena Doria as Hilda Gutierrez
- Adriana Rojo as Rosamaria Mejía
- Ernesto Gómez Cruz as Román Carvajal
- Pepe Serna as Juan Vallejo
- Roxana Bonila-Giannini as Lupe Carrillo
- León Singer as Rogelio
- Enrique Muñoz as Adolfo Mejía
- Roger Cudney as factory foreman Alvarado

== Reception, criticism and legacy ==
For the 20th annual Ariel Awards of the Mexican Academy of Film Arts and Sciences in 1978, Treviño was nominated for Argumento original (Best Original Story) and Ópera prima (Best First Work) for Raíces de sangre.

In 1983, professor of Chicano/Latino Studies Dr. Alejandro Morales reviewed and analyzed the literature of three of Treviño's major 1970s works, stating about Raíces de sangre that it is "an antidote to Hollywood productions such as Boulevard Nights and Walk Proud, which focus on stereotypical images of Chicano gangs". He criticizes the film noting that, "[T]he film projects...a confusing vision of life on the Mexican–United States border." Morales further notes the symbolism of the fence dividing the border, and the Chicanos and the Mexicans, at the end of the film and observes that "...the criminals go unpunished and not even an educated Harvard lawyer will change the exploitative conditions that exist on the border."

In 1991, Raíces de sangre was included in an anthology of the 25 Most Significant Films of Latin American Cinema at the 36th Annual International Film Festival in Valladolid, Spain.

In his 2014 book, Latino Image Makers in Hollywood, author Frank Javier Garcia Berumen describes Treviño's Raíces de sangre as foundational to Chicano cinema.

== See also ==
- Cinema of Mexico
- Latin American culture
- List of Latin American films
- List of Mexican submissions for the Academy Award for Best Foreign Language Film
- Maquiladora
