= Rain of Gold =

Book by Victor Villaseñor

- Author: Victor Villaseñor
- Language: English
- Publication date: 1991

Rain of Gold is Victor Villaseñor's 1991 book, a national bestseller, which tells the story of his own parents who were undocumented immigrants from Mexico. Two families escaping from the Mexican Revolution to the relative safety of the United States have parallel experiences centered on their mothers' strength. It is available in Spanish as Lluvia de Oro.

== Chapter summaries ==
=== Prologue ===
Espirito (a Mexican Indian) "...followed a doe and her fawn in search for water" because the spring in his tribe's land had dried up. He eventually discovers a hidden spring. Some time after, a particularly harsh winter forced Espirito to go in search for food and supplies for his tribe. He eventually finds a store in a settlement near the Urique River. Espirito wanders into the store and talks to the store owner, Don Carlos Barrios, and wants to trade the water of the spring which he found for food and supplies. However, Don Carlos laughs at the idea, because the store is in a desert next to a river. Don Carlos asks Espirito if he has anything else to trade, but Espirito with great disappointment replies "All I have are these little stones and this ground water". Don Carlos does a double take and notices that those "little stones" are in fact gold nuggets, he then desperately chases down Espirito who was already headed out the door. Espirito is pleasantly surprised that Don Carlos suddenly wants to trade food and supplies for all his stones (golden nuggets). Espirito quickly trades, because he thinks that Don Carlos has lost it but might change his mind - Espirito does not know he has gold nuggets and assumes that they are nothing more than interesting looking and worthless stones.

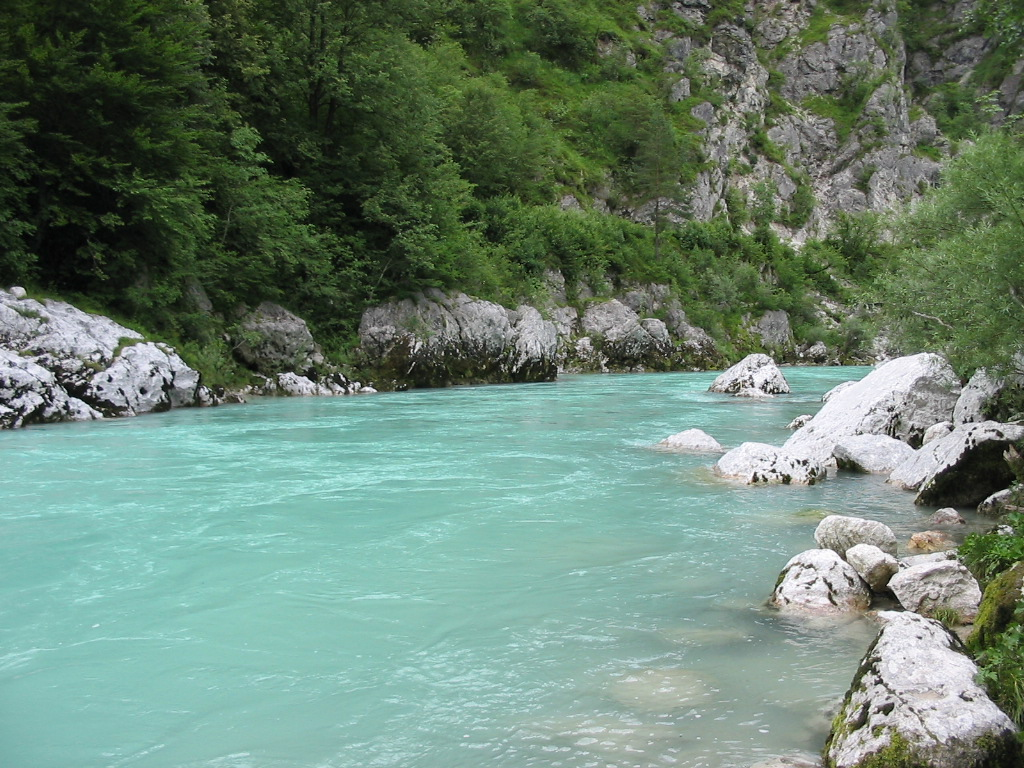
El Rio Urique

=== First chapter ===
The novel begins with the main character, Lupe Gomez, who lives with her mother, Doña Guadalupe, and her other sisters and brother in a ramada in the "Rain of Gold" valley. The family makes a living by selling breakfast to the local miners and washing their clothes. There is a group of colorful miners and most of them have problems with drinking and gambling. The village suffers repeated raids by various factions of the Mexican Revolution and ultimately the brazen Doña Guadalupe manages to protect her daughters and son. Eventually Lupe encounters a man named Colonel Manuel Maytorena, she simply calls "my colonel", a charismatic and romantic figure that Lupe seemingly falls in love with. For much of the beginning of the first chapter of the story she compares the things she enjoys in life to the Colonel, despite the fact that he is married to another woman and is nearly two decades older than she is. Swayed by the religious devotion of the Gomez family, the Colonel has them look after his young wife, Socorro, who is pregnant. While away on an escort mission to ship gold north to the United States, the Colonel is attacked and killed. Subsequently, the rebel fighters who slayed him return to the box canyon where Lupe lives and dominate the residents. They are a suspicious group and accuse Lupe's brother Victoriano of stealing gold from the mine and they try to hang him as an example to others. He is saved by his mother, who hands him a gun after she tells the rebels that she wants to give Victoriano his last prayer, but before Victoriano is able to escape, he shoots and kills La Liebre, the leader of the soldiers, who was attempting to kill Doña Guadalupe. Afterwards, La Liebre's second in command orders Doña Guadalupe to be hanged, but is stopped by the town's people gathering in a mob to stop them.

Shortly after the violence the towns people start to leave the city en masse to escape the violence of the Mexican revolution.

== Publication history ==
Villaseñor took twelve years to research the material for the book, but when the original publisher asked him to shorten it, change the title, and market it as fiction, he bought back the rights, using his mother's life savings and a new mortgage to do so. He then sold the book to Arte Público Press, and the hardcover became a San Francisco Chronicle best seller. The paperback rights were then bought by Bantam Doubleday Dell, and the book became a national bestseller and was published in seven other languages.

== Bibliography ==
- Villaseñor, Victor (1991). Rain of Gold. (ISBN 978-0-385-31177-9)
