= Mendiola (surname) =

Mendiola is a surname. Notable people with the surname include:

- Benigna Mendiola (born 1944), Nicaraguan socialist, revolutionary, and peasant leader
- Christopher Mendiola (born 1990), Guam footballer
- Dennis Mendiola (businessman), American investment banker and chief executive
- Dennis C. Mendiola, Northern Mariana Islander politician
- Jessy Mendiola (born 1992), Filipino actress
- Jim Mendiola, American screenwriter and film director
- Joseph M. Mendiola, Northern Mariana Islands politician
- Raúl Mendiola (born 1994), Mexican footballer
