= C. Ondine Chavoya =

American art historian, author, curator, professor (b. 1970)

- Born: Christopher L. Chavoya; 1970 (age 55–56); United States
- Other name: Ondine Chavoya
- Occupations: Art historian, scholar, independent curator, author, editor, educator

Academic background
- Education: University of California, Santa Cruz (BA), University of Rochester (MA, PhD)
- Thesis: Orphans of Modernism: Chicano Art, Public Representation, and Spatial Practice in Southern California (2002)
- Doctoral advisor: Janet Wolff

Academic work
- Discipline: Art history, Queer studies, Latino studies, Chicano studies

C. Ondine Chavoya (born 1970) is an American art historian, art curator, author, editor, and educator. He is known for his work in Chicano/Latino and queer art history. Chavoya is the John D. Murchison Regents Professor in the department of art and art history at the University of Texas at Austin (UT Austin). He was a co-editor of Chicano and Chicana Art: A Critical Anthology (Duke University Press, 2019).

== Biography ==
Christopher L. Chavoya was born in 1970, in the United States, and raised in Santa Ana. He received a B.A. degree in 1992, from the University of California, Santa Cruz; followed by a M.A. degree in 1996 and a Ph.D. in 2002 in visual and cultural studies, from the University of Rochester. His dissertation was titled Orphans of Modernism: Chicano Art, Public Representation, and Spatial Practice in Southern California (2002), under doctoral advisor Janet Wolff.

Chavoya was professor of art history and Latinx studies at Williams College in Williamstown, Massachusetts from 2002 to 2022, where he founded the department.

He is one of the 2023–2024 MoMA Scholars.

== Publications ==
- Chavoya, C. Ondine (2006). Women Boxers: The New Warriors. Delilah Montoya (photography), María Teresa Márquez (contributor). Arte Público Press, University of Houston. ISBN 9781611923360.
- Chavoya, C. Ondine; González, Rita, eds. (2011). Asco: Elite of the Obscure: A Retrospective, 1972–1987. Williams College Museum of Art.
- Chavoya, C. Ondine; Frantz, David Evans (2018). Axis Mundo: Queer Networks in Chicano L.A. Leticia Alvarado, Julia Bryan-Wilson, Simon Doonan. National Geographic Books. ISBN 9783791356693.
- González, Jennifer A.; Chavoya, C. Ondine; Noriega, Chon; Romo, Terezita, eds. (2019). Chicano and Chicana Art: A Critical Anthology. Duke University Press. ISBN 9781478003403.
- Lash, Miranda; Chavoya, C. Ondine; Clayton, Jace (2022). Eamon Ore-Giron: Competing with Lightning. Rizzoli. ISBN 9780847871322.
