= José Antonio Villarreal =

Chicano novelist (1924–2010)

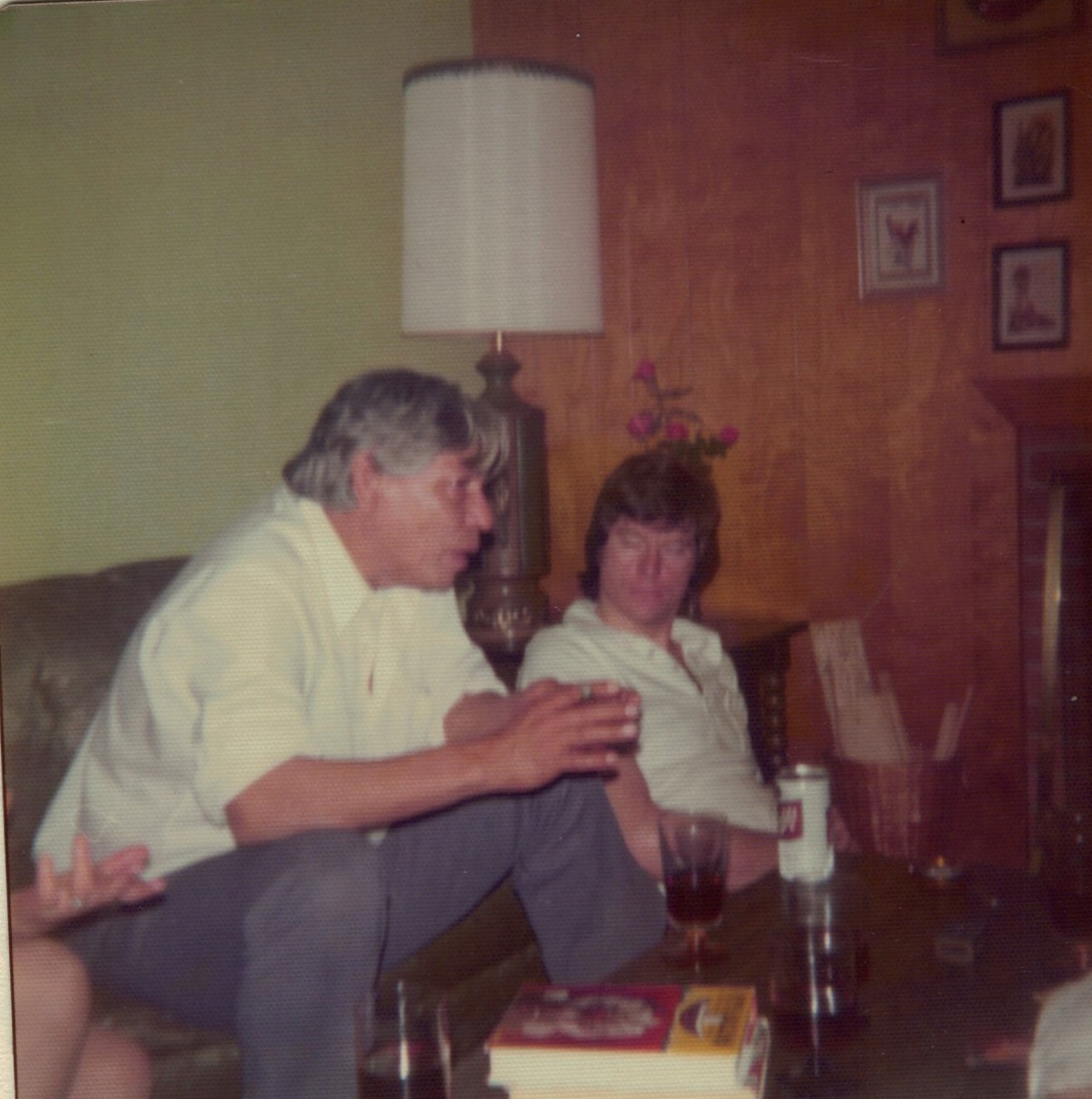
- Villarreal in 1974
- Born: 30 July 1924; Los Angeles, California
- Died: 13 January 2010 (aged 85); California
- Occupation: Novelist
- Writing career
- Genre: Chicano literature
- Notable works: Pocho; The Fifth Horseman
- Literary movement: Chicano

Signature
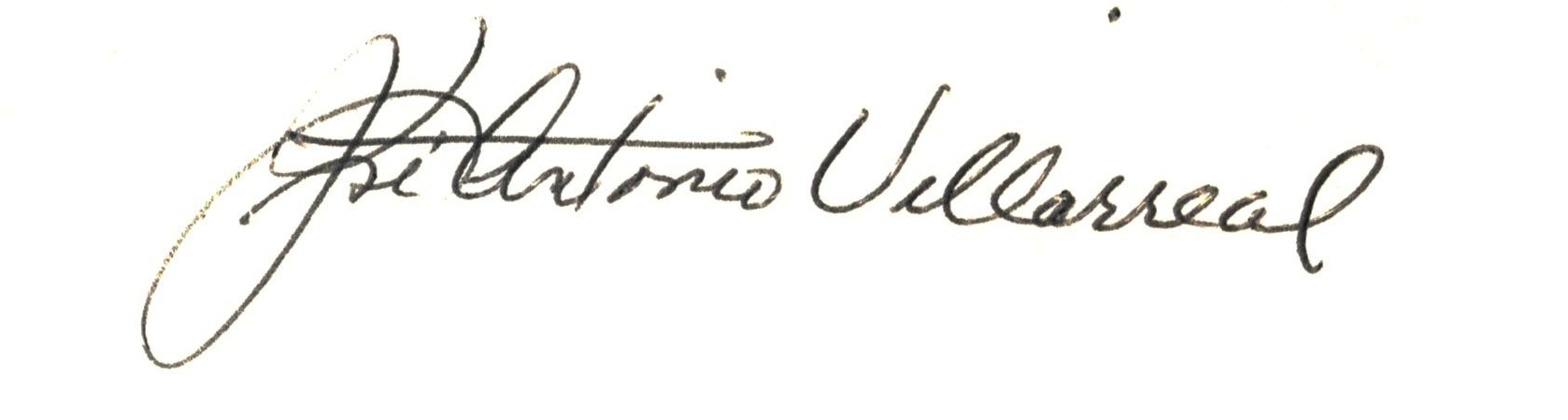

José Antonio Villarreal (30 July 1924 – 13 January 2010) was a Chicano novelist. (Note: Despite not identifying as such, he recognized his involvement in the movement, rejecting the political connotations.) Villarreal was born in 1924 in Los Angeles, California, to migrant Mexican farmworkers. Like Juan Manuel Rubio in Pocho, Villarreal's father fought with Pancho Villa in the Mexican Revolution. He spent four years in the Navy before attending the University of California, Berkeley in 1950. He cited his influences as Spanish literature, Latin American literature, primarily Mexican literature; English literature, specifically James Joyce, William Faulkner, and Thomas Wolfe.

== Biography ==
Born on 30 July 1924 to Mexican migrants in Los Angeles, when 3-months-old, his family moved to Santa Clara. Growing up in tents and boxcars with his uneducated, monolingual parents, he received elementary and secondary schooling; his community was a Mexican enclave, primarily Norteño, yet containing "people from every state". Invested in their oral histories, at six, he decided he wanted to be a storyteller. He entered first grade not knowing any English, but with the assistance of his teacher Ms. Uriell, who did not speak Spanish, he learned, progressively improving each grade thereafter. He skipped third grade. In 1950, he received his Bachelor of Arts in English from the University of California, Berkeley. He worked as an assistant professor at the University of Colorado, English lecturer at the University of Santa Clara, technical editor for Aerospace Industries, and translator and editor for the Stanford Research Institute.

In 1976, Villarreal and his family settled in Guadalajara, Mexico, with him working as an editor in the literature department of the Jalisco Department of Bellas Artes.

== Incomplete tetralogy ==
Villarreal's novel Pocho (1959) is one of the first Chicano novels, and the first to gain widespread recognition. Pocho has been called the "pivotal transitional link between 'Mexican American' and 'Chicano' literature", both because of its strengths as a novel and because of its use in the rediscovery and recuperation of Latino literature in the 1970s. Partially based on his childhood, the novel details the childhood of Richard Rubio, whose father Juan Manuel left Mexico in the post-Revolution exodus of 1910. As a first-generation American, Richard struggles with the conflicting values of his parents: his father's Mexican sense of honor, tradition, pride and masculinity and the more Americanized view of family and women's roles that his mother and especially his sisters adopt. Richard's father harbors a dream to return his family to Mexico, but his circumstances and choices keep him in the United States. Similarly, Richard does well in school and wants to go to college to become a writer, but he must become the man of the house after his father leaves the family; yet Richard himself leaves the family to join the Navy after the attack on Pearl Harbor. According to scholar Francisco A. Lomelí, the novel argues "that people of Mexican descent have a rightful place they can claim their own that is both Mexican and Anglo American, which Chicanos synthesize in varying degrees [and] accentuates, for the first time in a mainstream American literary scene, Hispanic characters as complex and multidimensional who, despite their individual flaws, possess depth and credibility".

The Fifth Horsemen (1974) is Pocho's prequel, ending with the death of Pancho Villa, beginning the latter. In 1976, he stated the next book, half written at that point, was to be The Houyhnhnms with protagonist Richard Rubio becoming Mike de la O post-war; such would have been followed by Call Me Ishmael, about his son at the University of Colorado and involved in Chicanismo. He also expressed interest in writing about Antonio López de Santa Anna and a travel book similar to James A. Michener's Iberia.

== Works ==
- Fiction
1. "Some Turn to God," short story, Pegasus, 1947
2. "A Pot of Pink Beans Boiling," short story, San Francisco Review, 1959
3. POCHO, a novel, Doubleday & Company, New York, 1959
4. POCHO, reprint, Anchor Books, New York 1971
5. "The Conscripts," short story, Puerto del Sol, 1973
6. THE FIFTH HORSEMAN, a novel of the Mexican Revolution, Doubleday & Company, New York, 1974
7. THE FIFTH HORSEMAN, Second edition, The Bilingual Press/Editorial Bilingue, State University of N.Y., Binghamton, 1984
8. POCHO, New Edition, in Anchor Literary Series, Anchor Books, Doubleday & Company, New York, 1984
9. CLEMENTE CHACON, novel, Bilingual Press/Editorial Bilingue, State University of N.Y., Binghamton,1984
10. TWO SKETCHES: "The Last Minstrel in California," and "The Laughter of My Father," Iguana Dreams, ed. Delia Poey and Virgil Suarez, Harper-Collins, 1992
11. POCHO, Spanish Language edition, transl. Roberto Cantu, Anchor Books, N.Y. 1994
- Articles
1. "The Fires of Revolution," Holiday Magazine, 1965
2. "California: "The Mexican Heritage," Holiday Magazine, 1965
3. "Mexican-Americans in Upheaval," West Magazine of the Los Angeles Times, September 1966
4. "Mexican-Americans and the Leadership Crisis," West Magazine, September 1966
5. "Olympics, 1968, "Mexico's Affair of Honor," Empire Magazine, Denver Post, April 1968

== See also ==
- List of Mexican American writers
- Rasquachismo
