= Ron Arias =

American novelist

- Born: Ronald Francis Arias; November 30, 1941 (age 84); Los Angeles, California, U.S.
- Occupations: Journalist, author
- Spouse: Joan Arias (m. 1967; died 2017)
- Partner: Karen de la Peña (2021–present)
- Children: 1
- Writing career
- Period: 1962–present
- Genres: Novels, short stories, essays, memoirs
- Notable awards: National Book Award; 1975 (nominated)
- Website: ronarias.net

Ronald Francis Arias (born November 30, 1941) is an American former senior writer and correspondent for People magazine and People en Español. He is also a highly regarded author whose novel The Road to Tamazunchale has been recognized as a milestone in Mexican-American literature.

About Arias' fiction anthology, The Wetback and Other Stories (2016), author Paul Theroux writes, "I felt reading these wonderful stories that I was admitted to an adjacent neighborhood, a rich culture that is another world—call it Amexica—both mysterious and magical, that is persuasive through its tenderness. My hope is that Ron Arias continues to write short stories that tell us who we are."

== Early life ==
A Los Angeles native, Arias spent his early years in a neighborhood located between the Los Angeles River and Elysian Park known as Frog Town or Elysian Valley, the allegorical setting for much of his fictional work.

== Career ==
=== Journalism ===
Arias' journalism career began in 1962 in Argentina working for the English-language daily newspaper, Buenos Aires Herald. Later, he became a Peace Corps volunteer near Cusco, Peru, contributing to the Christian Science Monitor an eyewitness account of a massacre of farmers by government troops. He also worked for a year on the Daily Journal in Caracas, Venezuela, thereafter publishing as a freelancer to various publications, including The Nation, the Los Angeles Times, Hispanic Link, and Nuestro magazine.

In 1985 Arias began work as a People magazine senior writer with a global beat. His feature byline stories focused on all manner of people in war, famine, hurricanes, earthquakes and other calamities.

Of his time as the magazine's parachute journalist, Arias has said, "On every continent, I covered five wars, famine, earthquakes, hurricanes, all kinds of disasters in Haiti, Somalia, Ethiopia, Australia, Vietnam, Moscow, you name it." His first major disaster article was the 1985 Mexico City earthquake, which he was assigned simply because he was the only staff member fluent in Spanish.

=== Literary work ===
Arias' work is influenced by twentieth-century Latin American literature and he has been called "a post-modernist who integrates in his fiction a keen eye for actual Mexican-American experience."

==== The Road to Tamazunchale ====
Arias' best known work is the novel The Road to Tamazunchale, for which numerous critical studies exist. The Road to Tamazunchale depicts the last days of Fausto Tejada, an old widower being cared for by his teenage niece in Los Angeles and occasionally visited by the spirit of his dead wife. Fausto spends his final days in a number of fantastic scenarios that suggest magic realism.

Tamazunchale, while a real place, serves here as a metaphorical place, a magical place where wishes come true but that can never really be reached; the real town is never shown in the novel, but is used in the fantastical play that Fausto and his neighbors create called "The Road to Tamazunchale". The novel radically breaks with the tradition of Chicano literature that focuses on learning to understand reality, constructing a Chicano version of history and bringing order to the world. Instead, Arias' protagonist is more a creator of worlds than an interpreter of them.

Chicano Literature: A Reference Guide's entry for Arias describes The Road to Tamazunchale as a breakthrough work of Chicano fiction:

It may be that future historians of American literature will look back on The Road to Tamazunchale as critics now look at Joyce's Portrait of the Artist as a Young Man: as the foundation piece by which Joyce emerges from the matrix of his marginal, minority culture to transform its localism into enduring and lucid literary symbols relevant to the universal human experience.

A feature film adaptation of The Road to Tamazunchale entitled Fausto's Road is in the works.

==== The Wetback and Other Stories ====
According to Arias himself, The Wetback and Other Stories, a collection of short stories inspired by the Mexican-American denizens of the Elysian Valley of his youth, is an attempt to "bridge the white world and the darker Spanish-speaking world":

They are right next door, they are in our backyards, they take care of our kids, they wash our dishes... who are these people? This is who they are. It's a literary treatment or peek at that but... I want to humanize Mexicans or people from my kind of background, not just Mexicans, but all Latin Americans because I do have their perspective.

==== Gardens of Plenty ====
In 2024, Arias published Gardens of Plenty, his historical novel about the adventures of Joseph Fields, a teenage orphan who flees the squalor of 16th-century London aboard a British slave ship and finds himself shipwrecked in colonial Mexico.

== Personal life ==
While a student at UCLA, Arias met and quickly married his wife Joan, then working towards her doctorate in Hispanic languages and literature. Their only son is filmmaker Michael Arias, currently residing in Tokyo, Japan.

Arias is an accomplished potter (retiring from People having ignited a previously dormant passion for the fine arts).

== Awards and honors ==
- 1975 National Book Award, nominee, The Road to Tamazunchale
- 1975 University of California, Irvine, Chicano/Latino Literary Prize, first prize, The Wetback
- 2003 Latino Literary Hall of Fame Award, best biography, Moving Target
- 2004 Los Angeles Press Club Award for wire service/daily or weekly newspaper bureau, People magazine's coverage of the Laci Peterson murder
- 2016 Peace Corps Award, The Wetback and Other Stories

== List of works ==
=== Fiction ===
- The Road to Tamazunchale (1975) — Arias' seminal novel about the fantastical journeys of an old man approaching death, National Book Award nominee.
- The Wetback and Other Stories (2016) — a collection of short fiction about the Mexican-American inhabitants of Los Angeles' Elysian Valley neighborhood.
- Gardens of Plenty (2024) — a historical adventure novel set in the 16th century.

=== Non-fiction ===
- Five Against the Sea (1988) — survival tale of five men who survived 142 days drifting at sea
- Healing from the Heart (1988) with Dr. Mehmet Oz — famed surgeon Mehmet Oz relates his experiences combining modern and traditional medical therapies
- Moving Target: A Memoir of Pursuit (2002) — Arias' childhood recollections and the search for his POW father, Latino Literary Hall of Fame Award recipient
- White's Rules: Saving Our Youth One Kid at a Time (2007) with Paul D. White — story of a Canoga Park school teacher's response to the killing of a student
- My Life as a Pencil (2015) — a collection of essays about Arias' travels as a journalist

=== Notable articles ===
- "Red agitation Peru Indians stirred", Christian Science Monitor (October 5, 1965) as Ronald Arias — Peru government crackdown on an indigenous guerrilla uprising
- "The Rooster That Called Me Home", The Nation (June 18, 1983)
- "Sorrow and Strength Amid the Ruins", People (October 7, 1985) — Arias' reporting of the 1985 Mexico City earthquake
- "Red Wine, Hemingway and Me", People (October 14, 1985) — a chance encounter between Ernest Hemingway and a young Arias in Pamplona, Spain
- "Against All Odds", People (October 26, 1987) — profiles of three children thriving despite hardship
- "A Trip to the Edge", People (July 11, 1988) — source for Arias' book Five Against the Sea
- "Jane Goodall", People (May 4, 1990) — profile of the world's foremost expert on chimps in the wild
- "Heaps of Pain," Who (January 4, 1992)
- "From Inca to Inka Kola", Going Up Country: Travel Essays by Peace Corps Writers (1994) — Arias' travels in Peru as a Peace Corps volunteer
- "Snakes," Brevity: A Journal of Concise Literary Non-fiction Issue 31 (September 25, 2009) — jogging in Managua with Daniel Ortega

== Bilbiographical Resources ==
https://faculty.ucmerced.edu/mmartin-rodriguez/index_files/vhAriasRon.htm

== See also ==
- Chicanismo
- List of Mexican American writers
- Latin American literature
- Post-modernism
