= The Adventures of Don Chipote =

1928 book by Daniel Venegas

Las aventuras de don Chipote, o cuando los pericos mamen [The Adventures of Don Chipote or When Parrots Breast-Feed] was written by the humorist and satirist, Daniel Venegas. It was first published in 1928 in the Spanish-language newspaper El Heraldo de México, in Los Angeles, California, and later published in English translation by Arte Público Press.

== Plot ==
The Adventures of Don Chipote tells the story of Don Chipote de Jesús María Domínguez, a simple Mexican farmer who decides to migrate from his small rural farm in Mexico to the United States in the hopes of earning money for himself and his family. After attempting to cross through an official port of entry in El Paso, Texas, he is denied entry because he is unable to pay the entrance fee or pass a literacy test. He eventually manages to cross the border, but once in Texas he receives sub-par wages and different con-men take advantage of him, preying upon his position as an undocumented migrant, his inability to speak or understand English, and his illiteracy. The narrator emphasizes Chipote's difficulties in adapting to the supposed modernity of the United States, describing, for example, Chipote's fear when he mistakes an electric trolley car for a big "cart which moved without oxen, and consequently made Don Chipote believe that it must be possessed by evil spirits."

Don Chipote eventually finds work laying railroad, but the novel shows that the work is dangerous, the bosses are racist, and the workers are underpaid and exploited. Chipote is injured on the job and taken to a hospital in Los Angeles. After recovering from his injuries, he eventually finds work as a dishwasher and seems to embrace modern life, buying ostentatious clothing, courting a Mexican American flapper, and even going to the movie theater with great frequency.

Back in Mexico, the family rancho is being poorly cared for by the lazy and deceitful Pitacio, and Doña Chipota fears her husband's infidelity when the letters and money he sends them become less and less frequent. Resolved to reunite with her husband, she decides to make the journey to the U.S. with all of her children. She sells off most of what they own and, after being swindled by a dishonest coyote, eventually crosses the border and makes it to Los Angeles. There, she serendipitously is reunited with her husband when she happens to stop in the same theater he frequents and sees him performing a love poem for the flapper he is trying to woo. Enraged, Doña Chipota physically attacks him on stage. The police are called and, eventually, the entire family is deported back to Mexico. At the end of the novel, Don Chipote still dreams of returning to the United States, but expresses disillusion with the American Dream, stating that “Mexicans will make it big in the United States … WHEN PARROTS BREASTFEED."

== Main characters ==
=== Don Chipote de Jesús María Domínguez ===
The eponymous main character of the novel, Don Chipote is a clear reference to the character of Don Quixote, a character with whom he shares many characteristics: his optimism but also naïveté in the pursuit of fantastic goals. "Chipote" also means a bump on the head in Mexican Spanish, and underscores the importance of the body, the physical traumas that Chipote experiences throughout the novel, and the physical humor that is an essential part of the novel.

=== Doña Chipota ===
Don Chipote's wife and mother to his "chipotitos", Doña Chipota is described as a strong-willed and determined woman who eventually migrates to the United States with her children in order to rescue Chipote and bring him back home to Mexico with her.

=== Sufrelambre ===
Sufrelambre is Don Chipote's faithful dog and sidekick. His name is a play on sufre hambre ("suffer" and "hunger" in Spanish) suggesting he is destined to continually go hungry, and translated into English as Skinenbones.

=== Policarpo ===
Don Chipote's friend, a fellow migrant from Mexico who accompanies Don Chipote on his journey.

=== Pitacio ===
Pitacio is a Mexican immigrant from Chipote's hometown who, at the beginning of the novel, has recently returned from the United States. He reinforces the (false) idea that the United States is a place where Chipote can easily make a lot of money. When Chipote leaves for the United States, Pitacio agrees to stay with Chipote's family and take care of the planting and other necessary tasks on the farm in Chipote's absence. However, Doña Chipota reports in her letters to Don Chipote that Pitacio quickly abandons these duties. Pitacio is portrayed as lazy and deceitful in the novel.

== Major themes ==
=== Chicano and Mexican identity ===
Some critics have called The Adventures of Don Chipote the first Chicano novel due in part to Venegas's use of the term "Chicano" perhaps for the first time in a literary work, as well as his use of code-switching and Spanish slang (caló). But other critics have pointed out that although the term "Chicano" appears in the novel, "Chicano" at this time was not being used in the way that it came to be used later in the twentieth century, to refer to someone who was a U.S.-born and raised Mexican American; in fact, at the time the novel was published, the term was often used pejoratively by Mexican Americans to refer to Mexicans. Nonetheless, the novel is significant for being one of the earliest literary depictions of Mexican American and Mexican immigrant communities, and the growing cultural and linguistic divisions that were emerging between these communities.

== Style ==
The Adventures of Don Chipote engages with several literary traditions and genres, including the travel narrative, the picaresque novel, metafiction, the comical Mexican peladito stock character, and Miguel de Cervantes's famous novel, Don Quixote.

== Historical context ==
Although fictional, the novel reflects the quickly changing realities of immigration for Mexicans to the United States during this time period. With the establishment of the Border Patrol in 1924, border crossing between Mexico and the United States became more tightly monitored and controlled. Don Chipote's experience of being denied entry through a legal port of entry, for example, due to his poverty and illiteracy, reflects how legal entry became very difficult if not impossible for poor and working class Mexicans who could not afford the entrance fees or pass required literacy tests.

== Bibliography ==
- Aldama, Frederick Luis. The Routledge Concise History of Latino/a Literature. Taylor and Francis, 2013.
- Bracken, Rachel Conrad. “Borderland Biopolitics: Public Health and Border Enforcement in Early Twentieth-Century Latinx Fiction.” English Language Notes, vol. 56, no. 2, 2018, pp. 28–43.
- Fallon, Paul. “Staging a Protest: Fiction, Experience and the Narrator’s Shifting Position in Las aventuras de don Chipote o Cuando los pericos mamen.” Confluencia, vol. 23, no. 1, 2007, pp. 115–127.
- Feu López, María Montserrat. “The U.S. Hispanic Flapper: Pelonas and Flapperismo in U.S. Spanish-Language Newspapers, 1920–1929.” Studies in American Humor, vol. 1, no. 2, 2015, pp. 192–217.
- Hernández, Kelly Lytle. Migra!: A History of the U.S. Border Patrol. University of California Press, 2010.
- Herrera, Spencer R. "The Pocho Palimpsest in Early 20th Century Chicano Literature from Daniel Venegas to Américo Paredes." Confluencia, vol. 26, no. 1, pp. 21–33.
- Kallendorf, Hilaire. "Don Quijote in Los Angeles: Daniel Venegas's Don Chipote and its Cervantine Model." Romance Notes, vol. 60, no. 2, 2020, pp. 315–325.
- Kanellos, Nicolás. Introduction. The Adventures of Don Chipote; or, When Parrots Breastfeed, by Daniel Venegas, Arte Público, 2000, pp. 1–17.
- Urquijo-Ruiz, Rita E. Wild Tongues: Transnational Mexican Popular Culture. University of Texas Press, 2012.
