= Mary Helen Ponce =

American novelists

- Born: January 24, 1938 (age 88); Pacoima, California, U.S.
- Occupation: Novelist

Academic background
- Education: California State University, Northridge; University of New Mexico; University of California, Los Angeles

Academic work
- Discipline: Chicano studies
- Institutions: California State University; University of New Mexico; University of California

Mary Helen Ponce is a chicana writer. She was born on January 24, 1938, in Pacoima, California. She has worked as an instructor of Chicano studies at California State University, Northridge from 1982 to 1987 and from 1987 to 1988 she was also an adjunct professor. From 1988 to 1992 she was adjunct faculty in the Women's Studies Program at the University of New Mexico, Women's Studies Program. She was an adjunct faculty member at University of California, Santa Barbara from 1992 to 1993. She is also a writer for the Los Angeles Times. She earned her bachelor's degree in anthropology from California State University, Northridge in 1978 and then a master's degree in Chicano Studies in 1980. She studied from 1982 to 1984 at the University of California at Los Angeles. There she was the recipient of the History Department's Danforth Fellowship. She worked toward her Ph.D. at the University of New Mexico in 1988. She is a member of Comisión Femenil San Fernando Valley.

== Works ==
- Taking Control, 1987, Arte Publico Press, ISBN 978-0934770705
- The Wedding, 1989, rev. ed., 2008, Arte Publico Press, ISBN 978-1558855236
- The Lives and Works of Five New Mexican Women Writers, 1936–1990 (monograph), 1992
- Hoyt Street: An Autobiography, 1993, University of New Mexico Press, ISBN 978-0826314468
- Calle Hoyt: Recuerdos de una Juventud Chicana, 1995, Anchor Press, ISBN 978-0385475518
