= Luis Omar Salinas =

American poet

- Born: June 24, 1937; Robstown, Texas
- Died: May 25, 2008 (aged 70); Sanger, California, United States
- Education: Bakersfield College (AA)
- Occupations: Author; poet; professor

Luis Omar Salinas (1937–2008) was a leading Chicano poet who published a number of well-received collections of poetry, including the Crazy Gypsy, which has been described as "a classic of contemporary and Chicano poetry", I Go Dreaming Serenades, and Afternoon of The Unreal. He was awarded the Stanley Kunitz award by Columbia Magazine for one of his poems, and a General Electric Foundation Award. Salinas is regarded as "one of the founding fathers of Chicano poetry in America," with many of his poems being "canonized in U.S. Hispanic literature."

== Life ==
Salinas was born on June 24, 1937, in Robstown, Texas. His father, Rosendo Valdez Salinas, was a second generation Mexicano-Tejano. Salinas was raised under poor circumstances in Robstown until, as a teenager, he moved with his family to California.

After graduating from Bakersfield High School, he served in the United States Marines Reserves and attended Bakersfield College, where he earned an Associate of Arts degree in history. He then studied under Henri Coulette at California State University at Los Angeles before transferring to California State University Fresno.

Salinas dropped out of college and supported his writing through most of his life by doing various jobs. Toward the end of his life he returned to California State University Fresno, where he taught poetry. He died on May 25, 2008, in Sanger, California.

== Poetry ==
Salinas is regarded as "one of the founding fathers of Chicano poetry in America." While a student at California State University Fresno Salinas published his first book, Crazy Gypsy, which sold well and earned him a reputation as both "a Chicano poet and as one of the leaders of the 'Fresno School' of poets, which included Gary Soto, Ernesto Trejo, Leonard Adame and others." The book served as an "anthem for Chicano activists," with many of the poems being reprinted in Chicano poetry anthologies and being "canonized in U.S. Hispanic literature."

Fellow Chicano poet Gary Soto wrote of Salinas that he "possesses a powerful imagination, a sensitivity toward the world, and an intuitive feel for handling language."

== Awards ==
Salinas has won the Earl Lyon Award for poetry writing from Fresno State University (1980), and the Stanley Kunitz award from Columbia Magazine at Columbia University for his poem "Letter Too Late To Vallejo" (1982). In 1984, he received an award from the General Electric Foundation, and in 1985 he was invited to read his poetry at the Library of Congress with Sandra Cisneros.

== Bibliography ==
- Crazy Gypsy, Fresno, CA: Origines Publication, La Raza Studies, Fresno State College, 1970.
- I Go Dreaming Serenades, San Jose, CA: Mango Publications, 1979.
- Afternoon of The Unreal, Fresno: Abramas Publications, 1980.
- Prelude To Darkness, San Jose: Mango Publications, 1981.
- Darkness Under The Trees / Walking Behind The Spanish, Berkeley: Chicano Library Studies Publications, University of California,1982.
- The Sadness of Days: Selected and New Poems, Houston: Arte Publico Press, University of Houston, 1987.
- Follower of Dusk, Chico, CA: Flume Press, 1991.
- Sometimes Mysteriously, Anchorage: Salmon Run Press, 1997.
- Greatest Hits 1969-1996, Johnstown, OH: Pudding House Publications, 2002.
- Elegy for Desire, Univ. of Arizona Press, 2005.
