= Maria Cristina Mena =

American writer

Maria Cristina Mena (later María Cristina Chambers; April 3, 1893 – August 3, 1965) was the author of eleven short stories, five children's books, and a nonfiction article. She is best known for her short stories, published mainly in The Century Magazine and American Magazine from 1913 to 1916. With renewed interest in the history of Mexican-American literature and the publication of all her short fiction in The Collected Stories of María Cristina Mena, her work is now receiving greater consideration.

== Biography ==
Mena was born in Mexico City during the regime of President Porfirio Diaz. She received her early education at an English boarding school where she became fluent in Spanish, English, French, and Italian. Later in her life, Mena learned Braille and converted a variety of works, including her own children's literature, into Braille as part of her advocacy work for the blind Daughter to a “politically powerful and socially prominent” family, she was sent to New York City in 1907 to escape the political tensions that led to the Mexican Revolution. Six years later, Mena published her first short stories in The Century Magazine and American Magazine. She continued to write for them until 1916, when she married playwright and journalist Henry Kellet Chambers. Mena did not produce any writings between 1916 and 1942, apart from her posthumously published correspondence with D.H. Lawrence. In 1942 Mena published the first of five children's books under her married name, Maria Cristina Chambers, the last of which was published in 1953. Her final publication in The Texas Quarterly, “Afternoons in Italy with D.H. Lawrence,” was printed the year before her death at seventy-two.

== Century Magazine ==
Mena reached an audience of predominantly middle- and upper-class white Americans by writing for The Century Magazine, which in quality and quantity was among the leading general monthly periodicals at the time. Increased immigration during the early twentieth century challenged the magazine's erudite readership, who struggled for a distinctive national identity; Century editors responded by publishing fiction that encouraged xenophobia and domestic homogeneity, or what they termed a “common quality.” Articles in Century promoted an exotic and demeaning view of foreign cultures through focus on negative stereotypes; photographs and illustrations lent seeming authenticity to these depictions. The notion that Mena supported Century's perspective is refuted by the veiled social commentary of her short stories, and more explicitly, in her letters to the editors, in which she fights to include authentic elements of Mexican tradition in her work.

== Critical reception ==
Biographers Amy Doherty and Luis Leal differ in how they portray Mena and her work. Whereas Doherty emphasizes Mena's success as a Mexican-born, woman writer who published in English-language publishing houses (periodicals) that mainly catered to White audiences, Leal emphasizes the controversies in her technique of depicting Mexicans. Doherty portrays Mena as an “interpreter and a critic” whose literature was able to satiate America's fascination with Mexicans. She lists Mena's short stories, naming the magazine each work featured in and providing a short summary of its predominant themes. This list creates the impression that Mena was a very prolific writer.

Leal's depiction of Mena challenges this notion. Leal notes that because Mena used her married name Chambers, she was overlooked as a Chicano writer until writers like Raymund Paredes discovered her stories. Paredes criticized Mena's condescending view of the Indians in Mexico. He refers to Mena as a “talented story-teller whose sensibility unfortunately tended towards sentimentalism and preciousness.” Leal interprets Paredes’ comment to convey that Mena's “decorum“ in depicting the plight of Indians made her work have a “trivial and condescending” attitude towards Indians. In consequence, Leal argued, her work lacked a necessary force against Mexico's ruling class. Leal's presentation of Mena confines her success to her numerous publishing in a competitive market and highlights her shortcomings in her attempt to correct the misrepresentation of Indians in the fiction circulating in the U.S.

== Major themes ==
=== Stereotypes ===
Mena uses sentimental stereotypes of Mexican Indians, white Mexicans, and American tourists alike throughout her stories. She wrote during a time when people were “wary of the machine age many thought the U.S. was moving into” such that “commentators increasingly focused on Indians from both sides of the border as an antidote to the soulless impulse of modernity”. According to Yolanda Padilla, “Mena’s stories often attribute a picturesque, serene, and sage quality to the Indians that echoes such sentiments.” Mena frequently describes Mexican locals as immature children or animals. For example, in “John of God,” Dolores is depicted as a “chattering little squirrel of a wife”. Mena recalls the concept of a noble savage in describing Petra's voice “with all its tenderness holding a hint of barbaric roughness,” or revealing Miss Young's thoughts of her Mexican hosts as “a warmer, wilder people, with gallant gestures and languorous smiles” in “The Gold Vanity Set”.

Although critics generally dismiss Mena as a “local color” writer of “obsequious” characters, Mena deconstructs these stereotypes by using them to critique their proponents. In “The Gold Vanity Set” Don Ramon says of the Indians “We use the diminutive because we love them”. As T. Arab explains, “Don Ramón’s misrepresentation of the Indio continues with a series of ethnic generalizations that underscore the stereotyping of the indigenous peoples by the U.S. and Mexican upper-classes as uncivilized, emotional, irrational and child-like”. Similarly, in “The Education of Popo,” Alicia Cherry, judges the Mexican way of life on an American scale: “The summer flirtation of our happy land simply cannot be acclimated south of the Rio Grande. These people lack the necessary imperturbability of mind…”. Arab comments on Mena's “emphasis on Alicia’s tourist attitude, as well as her interest in consumption” and explains that “At the story’s conclusion Mena manages to display her white characters’ cultural shortsightedness by allowing them to voice their own ethnic self-importance. The frivolity and patronizing natures of Alicia and Don Ramon diminish the authority behind their stereotyped view of Mexican natives.

In spite of references such as Miss Cherry's to Mexico's “picturesque atmosphere” in “The Education of Popo,” Mena's cast of characters explicitly avoid being confined to this stereotypical framework. Popo does not fit into Alicia Cherry's conception of a “summer flirtation” and he ultimately refuses to be framed by Alicia's lips, either by the deceptive words emanating from them or by an actual kiss. More obviously, Petra in “The Gold Vanity Set” rebels against Miss Young's desire to commodify her ‘picturesqueness’ by refusing to be photographed, and the Senorita in “The Vine Leaf” blots out her face in the esteemed painting that would literally put her figure in a frame. Even within the painting, the smudging from the face creates a “rude rubbing that in some places has overlapped the justly painted frame of the mirror”. Margaret Toth explains: “Mena implicitly destabilizes the status of the image as bearer of truth. That is, she exposes images—including the photograph, which tends to carry an objective truth value—as manipulable, biased, and, therefore, suspect”. Just as the frames cannot contain the characters, so do stereotypes ultimately fail to describe real people.

Mena doesn’t trust images to represent something (especially a group of people) and there's evidence of her distaste in many of her works, such as in “The Vine-Leaf” where she subtly denounces vision and art-especially when used to describe or represent a woman's body. More so, this article argues that Mena doesn’t “trust” that art and images are truthful representations of reality and Toth manages to describe her position without being completely biased to her own opinions. This source can help delve deeper to answer more questions about how Mena shares these ideas through her characters and just how far her stand against imperialism goes.

Mena also utilizes stereotypes to critique foreign imperialism, namely in the form of capitalism. The narrator in “The Gold Vanity Set,” states that “business in the Mexican mind is dominated by sentiment,” suggesting that the disposition of all Mexicans is opposed to the dispassion of capitalism. The description of Miss Young and her tourist group furthers this implication: When they arrive at the inn and are courteously told, “The house is yours,” and the outrageously rude entrance made by Miss Young is literally an “invasion.” “The native population is literally driven out of its place and made to inhabit the periphery, while privileged travelers thoughtlessly occupy the vacated spots”. Mena likewise supports the preservation of Mexican culture in the face of foreign encroachment in “John of God, Water-Carrier,” which juxtaposes the quintessential Mexican John with his capitalist brother Tiburcio. John rejects the American plumbing system and refuses to engage in competition to win the affections of Dolores. Conversely, Tiburcio sacrifices his body to work the American pumps and take “the silver pieces he had earned by the sweat of his body”. The observation that “the capital was the place for him,” refers to “capital” as both the center of commerce and actual money. John, whose biblical name immediately gives him the moral high-ground, is set against the spirit of capitalism “that will bring about the destruction of the traditional ways of life of the Indio community, and will ultimately make this community culturally obsolete”. In “The Education of Popo,” Alicia Cherry embodies this destructive force when she “[monopolizes] the only member of this household to whom it is possible to communicate”. Her dyed hair and hoarding of Popo's affections represent American consumerism and “presented as questionable forms of cultural colonialism from the United States”.

=== Beauty and plastic surgery ===
The theme of beauty is prevalent in Mena's short stories, especially in her earlier works. This reflects the increased popularity of plastic surgery in the Americas during the 1910s. However, eyelid surgery was advertised as early as 1884 in Buenos Aires and Rio de Janeiro; in 1891 in Havana; while in 1898, Jacques Joseph surgically modified noses in Berlin. Mena makes use of the new procedures imported from the U.S. in her stories.

Ernestina in “Marriage by Miracle,” for example, uses plastic surgery to remove wrinkles and blemishes, and to modify her nose and eyes, so that her younger sister may marry. Beauty for the Ramos sisters is essential for “economic survival”. In fact Schuller contends that “beauty and birth of her upper class daughters are Dona Rosalia’s primary social capital”. Clarita's beauty helps her find a wealthy suitor, while Ernestina's “ugliness” prevents her from marrying. Clarita urges her sister to wrinkle her forehead less in order to gain a husband, suggesting that Ernestina must remain passionless, and sacrifice her emotions for beauty. Indeed, Ernestina is horrified to find she can no longer smile after the procedure, even after the reassurances from the doctor that this is the English style. However, Ernestina does not remain “passionless” as she pursues religion with zeal. She does not marry, avoiding the domestic sphere while using her newfound beauty to her spiritual advantage. Her physical transformation can also be seen as a critique of the “old elite” of Mexico, to which her family belongs. The Ramos family “struggle to manipulate appearance for their own social advantage,” to the extent of having servants carry covered dishes that only have a meager meal underneath. Ernestina's “elaborate physical deception” can be seen as the ultimate attempt to maintain appearances. Yet this desire to maintain a sense of superiority can be seen as ridiculous (as in the dishes) as well as harmful to the individual (Ernestina cannot smile after her operation).

Similarity, other characters in Mena's stories use surgical techniques in order to preserve their identity. In “The Vine-Leaf”, the marquesa removes a birth mark that looks like a vine leaf in order to, it seems, get away with murder. Ironically, the doctor describes the “blemish” as beautiful. Amy Doherty claims the marquesa removes the mark to protect her individuality, that is, she “seizes control of those who attempt to make her…a feminine and Mexican subject”. She does not allow her face to be reflected by a mirror in the portrait, nor does she allow the doctor or her husband to discover her identity, preventing them from fully possessing her. The varying interpretations of the story (the marquesa killed the painter and her husband knows, her husband does not know, or her husband in fact killed the painter) prevent even the reader from fully understanding her. The modes of rebellion enacted by Mena's female characters reveal “the shifts in gender roles during the Mexican Revolution”. Ernestina escapes from the domestic sphere through her beauty. Carmelita in “The Sorcerer and General Bisco” is more direct and rebels “against the social dictates of marriage and domesticity” by running away with her lover and turning into a revolutionary. Tula in “A Son of the Tropics” rebels by “making dynamite bombs out of doorknobs”. As Schuller remarks, Mena's “later stories tell of female revolutionaries who learn to use bombs, rather than wish to be blondes”.

Schuller analyzes Mena's stories, “The Gold Vanity Set,” “The Vine-Leaf,” and “Marriage by Miracle” in detail, through the lens of the influence of cosmetic products and surgeries on the stories’ female protagonists. The central argument of this article is Schuller's assertion that “the beauty industry functioned as a lightning rod for racial thinking”. Schuller identifies the materialization of whiteness as a product of neocolonialism in Mexico in the United States’ Progressive Era (c. 1890- late 1920s). This article provides information on the birth of cosmetic surgery and highlights many of the industry's milestones, such as the first training program and plastic surgery unit was established in Mexico in 1944. Schuller ties Mexico's long history with cosmetic surgery to Mena's stories via an analysis of these stories about beauty, that appear to treat it as a fundamental indicator of racial wealth, and explores these female characters that appropriate the American beauty industry in their own terms, which marks them as examples of Mexican resistance to United States-led modernization. The thread of neocolonialism permeates the length of the article; Schuller treats neocolonialism as a detriment to Mexican society, for America's influence was overbearing and attempted to erase the Mexican identity and replace it with the same white faces of the North, as American plastic surgeons in Mexico distributed whiteness as a commodity to those wealthy enough to participate.

=== Women and romance ===
Mena frequently uses romance as a tool by which her female characters assert power in a distinctly feminine way. In her story “The Sorcerer and General Bisco,” for example, Carmelita rebels against marriage, a move that according to some critics “represents the increasingly active role of women from varied classes in the Mexican Revolution”. Carmelita enunciates a common theme in Mena's work, that women achieve power through love, describing herself as “little and weak as you see me, with no power but love”. Critics have indeed described Mena as using the actions of women to frame her perspective on the relationship between the United States and Mexico. As they become gradually more rebellious and challenge social norms and mores, female characters provide a means for Mena to criticize Mexican class structure, as well as U.S.-Mexico border relations. The most explicit example of can be found in Mena's work “The Emotions of Maria Concepcion,” where the titular character falls in love with a Spanish matador, progressively establishing distance between herself and the control of her father. She eventually rebels against the idea that she should be completely domestic and care for her father as he becomes an old man. This change begins subtly—“What feeling was this that dilated the fine nostrils of Maria Concepcion, and chilled the sacrificial of her heart?”—and culminates in her avowal that she and her brother will go against their father's wishes and attend the climactic bullfight. Echoing many of Mena's stories, the character's power to rebel coincides with her ability to fall in love with the matador.

“The Emotions of Maria Concepcion” also provide a means for Mena to examine questions of cultural misunderstanding in the context of romance. She criticizes the American conception of Latinos being tempestuous lovers—“She loved without a hope of ever touching her lover’s hand; and the thought of contact with his lips would have troubled her with a sense of passion desecrated – passion all powerful, but also all delicate, immaterial, and remote compared with that which the North too confidently assumes to read in the smoldering eyes of the South”—a theme that is also echoed in the story “The Education of Popo,” where Alicia Cherry mentions that “The summer flirtation of our happy land simply cannot be acclimated south of the Rio Grande. These people lack the necessary imperturbability of mind, which may be one good reason why they’re not permitted to hold hands before the marriage ceremony”. Mena criticizes the conventional notions that her American readers may hold about the romantic aspect of Mexican culture by parodying the persons that hold them.

Mena presents Mexican female subjects as a new female ideal in the Progressive Era in the United States. Mena articulates Mexican women's interactions with American ideals through the use of “double voicing”. In her story “The Gold Vanity Set” the protagonist's admiration for the beauty of the American tourist is met by ¨this North American new women's cultural insensitivity and superficiality¨. The beauty set represents the United States social ideal of whiteness as superior and thus, women of color (specifically of Mexican descent) are inferior, “presented as a questionable form of cultural colonialism from the United States”. Through a clever use of language, irony, and satire in the narrator's voice in her stories, Mena pushes back against the ideal of white women's superiority. The book also analyzes the story, ¨John of God, the Water Carrier¨ and how the through the character of Dolores, Mena problematizes the subjugation of females in Mexico's patriarchal society.

=== Language ===
Critics have noted that in many of Mena's stories, she “simulated the flavor or Spanish by reproducing in English its syntactical and idiomatic qualities”. In the story “The Birth of the War God” the narrator uses at the beginning and end of the story a high version of English, with a verbose and formal structure, forcing the (white American) reader to identify with the narrator as part of their culture.

When the narrator describes the ancient Aztec legend told by her grandmother, the language switches to a more Spanish style, with verbs in front, in such phrases as "Arrived the autumn, and the afternoons became painted with rich reds". Mena also inserts Spanish phrases in this story, explaining through the voice of the narrator that “I render the construction literally because it seems to carry more of the perfume that came with those phrases as I heard them by the blue-tiled fountain”. While the insertion of Spanish phrases and sentence structures in contrast to the high version of English that frames the story creates a unique local atmosphere, some critics have said that this juxtaposition is Mena's way of “[c]onfronting the difficulties of mediating between two cultures”. Indeed, Mena, through the voice of the narrator, suggests that she may have been unsatisfied with the resulting translation: “The sonorous imagery of those well-remembered phrases loses much in my attempt to render them in sober English”. By ensuring the story of Huitzilopochtili is framed in the context of how it is told, Mena highlights the differences between the culture of the target reader and the foreignness of Mexico.

Mena displays a firm grasp of dialect in her stories that extends beyond simple sentence structure. In “The Education of Popo,” for example, she gives Alicia Cherry, a blonde American girl, an almost comically white vernacular: “I rag-timed up in my best tra-la-la style”. In this manner, Mena uses language to characterize her creations and make them accessible, or instantly legible as a cultural type, to her reader. At times this accessibility borders on the stereotypical, as Mena also tends to invest her Native American characters with slow, plodding speech, as evidenced in her short story “John of God, the Water-Carrier” where “Mena’s polyphonic narrations also signify class status: as in the simple, formal, sincere English of “John of God, the Water Carrier”. However, critics have suggested that Mena employs a phenomenon called "double voicing" or using dramatic irony to expose the inadequacy of the stereotypical notions about Mexicans that can be found in her work. Double voicing as defined by Mikhail Bakhtin is when “[T]he author exaggerates, now strongly, now weakly, one or another aspect of the “common language,” sometimes abruptly exposing its inadequacy to its object and sometimes, on the contrary”.

== Bilbiographical Resources ==
https://faculty.ucmerced.edu/mmartin-rodriguez/index_files/vhChambersMaria.htm
