= Mario Suárez (writer) =

American writer (1925–1998)

Mario Suárez (1925–1998) was one of the earliest Chicano writers. He was one of five children born to Mexican immigrants to the U.S. state of Arizona, Francisco Suárez and Carmen Minjárez Suárez. After high school, he joined the U.S. Navy and served during World War II. In the military, he was stationed off the coast of New Jersey, and also served in Brazil. After the war, he returned to Arizona where he enrolled in the University of Arizona. In 1947, while still an undergraduate, he began writing sketches for Arizona Quarterly magazine. Suárez later went on to become a journalist and a college educator, and publishing in Arizona Quarterly. Most of Suárez's literature takes place in "El Hoyo" (The Hole), the name of the Mexican American barrio in Tucson, Arizona, where he was raised. Often overlooked in the "canon" of Chicano Literature for writers such as Rudolfo Anaya and Rolando Hinojosa-Smith, Mario Suárez's writing pre-dates the Chicano literature movement in the 1960s and 1970s. Many of his sketches of Mexican immigrant and working class life were published in the mid- to late-1950s. From an anthropological standpoint, his work should be heralded for telling the Mexican immigrant story and documenting life in El Hoyo before its demise.

== Bibliography ==
- Chicano Sketches: Short Stories. Edited by Francisco A. Lomelí, Cecilia Cota-Robles Suárez, and Juan José Casillas-Núñez. Tucson: University of Arizona Press, 2004.
