= Hispanic Link =

Hispanic Link News Service is an American English-language Hispanic-oriented weekly news briefing founded in 1979 by Charlie Ericksen and his wife Sebastiana Mendoza in Washington D.C. It is distributed through the Los Angeles Times. OCLC 0295017.
