= Gwendolyn Zepeda =

American author (born 1971)

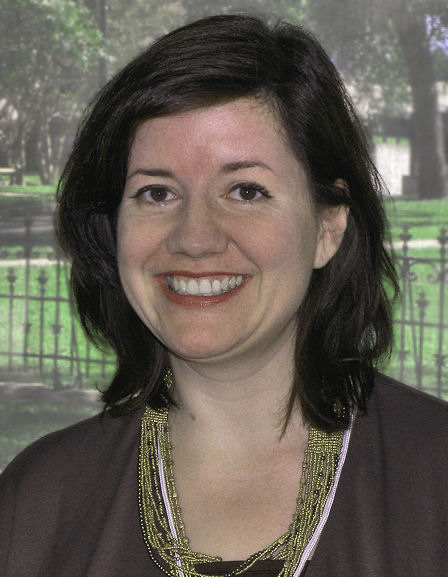
- Zepeda in 2009
- Born: December 27, 1971 (age 54); Houston, Texas, United States
- Education: University of Texas Austin
- Occupation: Author
- Honours: Houston's Inaugural Poet Laureate
- Website: http://gwendolynzepeda.com

Gwendolyn Zepeda (born December 27, 1971, in Houston, Texas) is an American author and poet of Mexican American descent. Zepeda is Houston's first Poet Laureate, serving a two-year term from 2013 to 2015. She was succeeded by Robin Davidson.

== History ==
Zepeda's father was Mexican American and her mother was a white American of German, Scottish, and Welsh ancestry. She was born and raised in Houston, Texas where she attended Dow and Roosevelt elementary schools, Hamilton Middle School, Reagan High School (now Heights High School), and the High School for Performing and Visual Arts (HSPVA). She subsequently attended the University of Texas at Austin.

== Writing ==
In June 1997, Zepeda started an online journal titled Gwen's Trailer Trash Page, which eventually evolved into Gwen's Petty, Judgmental, Evil Thoughts. Around the same time, she became a founding writer for Television Without Pity, a recap blog for late 1990s television shows, such as Ally McBeal and 7th Heaven. She is notable as one of the first bloggers to write and sell a book. She later blogged for the Houston Chronicle in 2009 and 2010.

Zepeda sold her first book, To the Last Man I Slept with and All the Jerks Just Like Him, a short story collection, in 2000. It was published by the Houston-based Latino publishing house, Arte Público Press, in 2004.

Her first novel, Houston, We Have a Problema is a chick lit novel and was published by Grand Central Publishing January 2009.

Her first picture book, Growing Up with Tamales, was published by Piñata Books, an imprint of Arte Público Press, in May 2008. It is a 2009 Charlotte Zolotow Highly Commended Title and was nominated for a Tejas Star Award. Piñata Books published her second picture book, Sunflowers, in May 2009.

Arte Público Press published her first book of poetry, Falling in Love with Fellow Prisoners, in 2014.

She cites Sandra Cisneros, Margaret Atwood, Alice Munro, Louise Gluck, Jane Austen, Ursula K. LeGuin, and Judy Blume as some of her writing influences.

== Bibliography ==
=== Short story collections ===
- To the Last Man I Slept with and All the Jerks Just Like Him. Houston, Texas : Arte Público Press, 2004. (ISBN 1558854061)

=== Novels ===
- Houston, We Have a Problema. New York : Grand Central Publishing, 2009.
- Lone Star Legend. New York : Grand Central Publishing, 2010.
- Better With You Here. New York : Grand Central Publishing, 2012.

=== Poetry ===
- Falling in Love with Fellow Prisoners: Poems. Houston, Texas : Arte Público Press, 2013.
- Monsters, Zombies and Addicts: Poems. Houston, Texas : Arte Público Press, 2015.

=== Children's books ===
- Growing Up with Tamales. Houston, Texas : Arte Público Press, 2008.
- Sunflowers. Houston, Texas : Arte Público Press, 2009.
- I Kick the Ball. Houston, Texas : Arte Público Press, 2010.
- Level Up. Houston, Texas : Arte Público Press, 2012.
- Maya and Annie on Saturdays and Sundays. Houston, Texas : Arte Público Press, 2018.

=== Anthologies ===
- Houston Noir. New York : Akashic Books, 2019.

== See also ==
- History of Mexican Americans in Houston
- Poet Laureates of Texas
