= Alejandro Morales =

American novelist

Alejandro Morales is a Mexican-American writer of fiction and poetry. He is an emeritus professor of Chicano and Latino Studies at the University of California, Irvine. He has published seven novels, three novellas, and one collection of poetry.

Morales received the 2007 Luis Leal Award for Distinction in Chicano/Latino Literature. The award organizer said of Morales, "he is a true pioneer in Chicano literature and one of the most outstanding, powerful, and innovative writers on the Chicano experience."

== Works ==
- Caras viejas y vino nuevo (1975) J. Mortiz, Mexico OCLC 2374645 published in English (1981) as Old Faces and New Wine, Maize Press, San Diego OCLC 8131156
- La Verdad sin voz (1979), published in English (1988) as Death of an Anglo.
- Reto en el paraíso (1983), a mix of Spanish and English.
- The Brick People (1988) Arte Público Press, Houston, Texas ISBN 978-0-93477-091-0
- The Rag Doll Plagues (1992)
- Barrio on the Edge (1997)
- Waiting to Happen (2001) - the first volume of the Heteropia Trilogy
- Pequeña Nación (2005) - three short novels
- The Captain of All These Men of Death (2008) Bilingual Press, Tempe, AZ ISBN 978-1-93101-040-5
- Little Nation and Other Stories (2014). Trans. Adam Spires. Houston: Arte Público Press.
- River of Angels (2014). Houston: Arte Público Press.
