= Jim Mendiola =

American film director

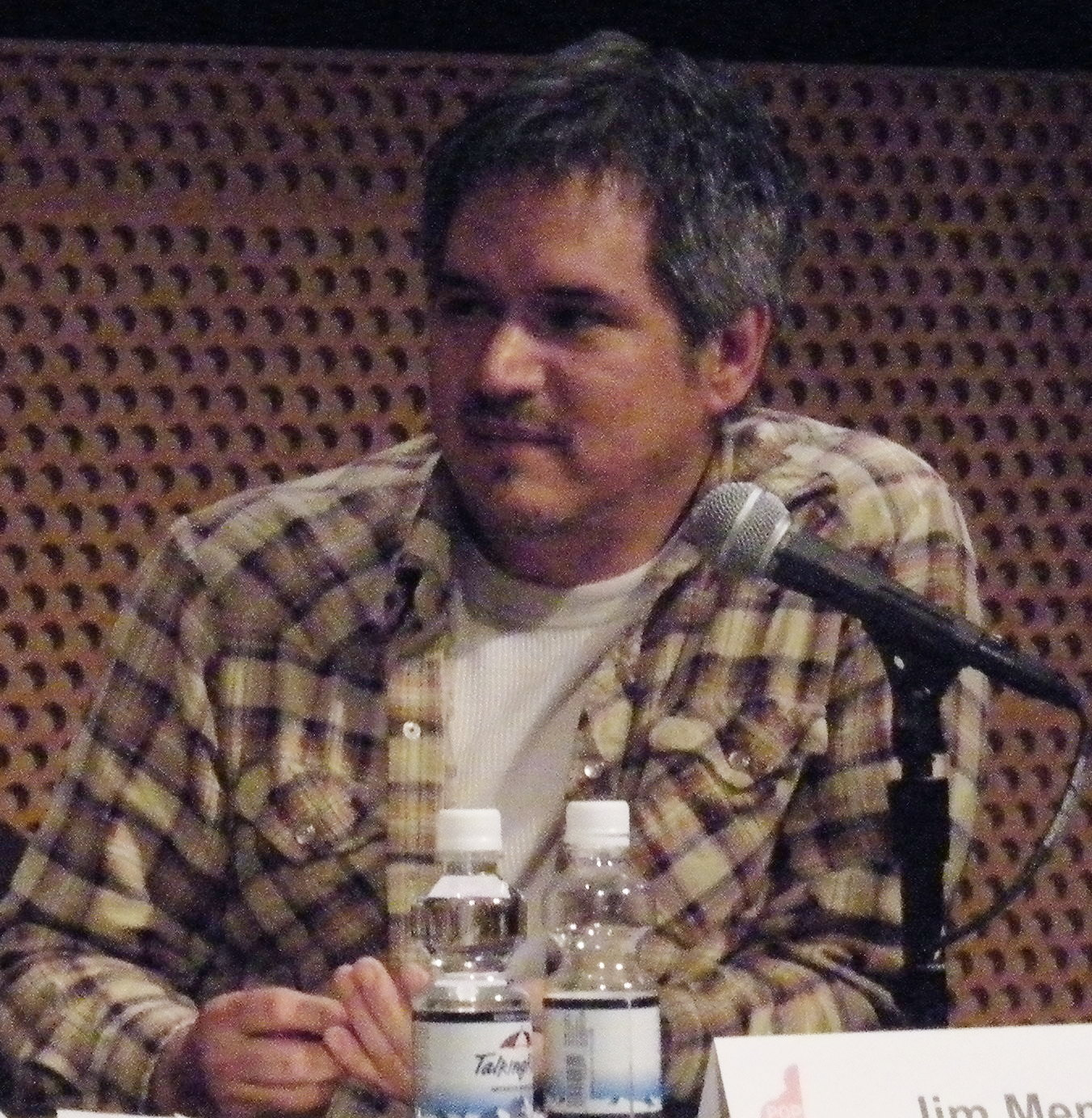
Jim Mendiola (2008)

Jim Mendiola (born in San Antonio, Texas, United States) is a Los Angeles based writer/director. His award-winning film Pretty Vacant (33 min., 16mm, 1996), about a Sex Pistols obsessed Chicana punk rocker, has screened in numerous film festivals, museums, and colleges in the United States and Mexico, including South By Southwest (Best Narrative Short), the Havana International Film Festival, and the Guggenheim Museum.

During Mendiola's Artpace residency in 2001, he collaborated with artist Ruben Ortiz Torres to create “Ozzy Goes to the Alamo,” which the duo claims to be “the world’s first Chicano 3-D movie.” Mendiola wrote and directed the one-hour movie Come and Take It Day (PBS national broadcast, 2002) starring Jacob Vargas and Jesse Borrego. Mendiola's first feature film, a rock and roll digital movie called Speeder Kills (2003) starring Amalia Ortiz and Xelina Flores, has screened at various film festivals across the country and was nationally broadcast on SíTV in the Spring of 2005. His script, “All the Young Dudes,” was chosen for participation in the 2004 IFP Screenwriter’s Lab and is currently in development. In addition, Mendiola is writing a screen adaptation of the Sandra Cisneros short story, "Bien Pretty."

A 1997 Rockefeller Intercultural Media Fellow, Mendiola is a regular contributor on television, soap operas and all things Latino and pop for the San Francisco Bay Guardian and other publications. His favorite band is Bon Scott-era AC/DC and his favorite album The Clash’s “London Calling.”
