= Joe Perez (writer) =

American writer (born 1969)

Joseph Perez (born 1969 in Moses Lake, Washington) is an American writer in the fields of spirituality and Integral theory.

== Life ==
Born as Joseph Perez in 1969 in Moses Lake Washington, Perez attended public schools until beginning his academic career at Harvard University, where he earned a bachelor's degree in The Comparative Study of Religion with Philosophy as Allied Field in 1991. Subsequently, he attended The Divinity School at The University of Chicago. Perez is an openly gay man, having come out during his senior year at Harvard.

Perez wrote a bi-weekly newspaper column called Soulfully Gay, which was distributed by the Contax Guide and The Weekly News in Florida, among other publications. He is the founder and manager for four years of the Gay Spirituality & Culture Weblog that originated around the time of the 2004 Gay Spirit Summit (the blog is still published today as the MyOutSpirit.com Gay Spirituality Blog). The Gay Spirit Summit was a gathering of gay men identified as leaders or change agents seeking to shift consciousness in the gay community and raise visibility of transformational experiences in order to change the conversation about what it means to be gay.

== Works ==
Perez is author of two books on spiritual development: Soulfully Gay: How Harvard, Sex, Drugs, and Integral Philosophy Drove Me Crazy and Brought Me Back to God, a book combining a variety of short writings including memoir, journal entries, reviews, and interviews, about his discovering of an Integral approach to understanding the spiritual significance of homosexuality; Rising Up: Reflections on Gay Culture, Politics, Spirit which advances an agenda for gay activism informed by an evolutionary psychological model.

Soulfully Gay is a memoir developed from a blog, and chronicles his efforts to come to grips with illness and spirituality. It is a chronologically organized diary through which Perez describes the events that led him from being a Catholic youth from a working-class background to a Harvard student, and then on to sexual rebellion, drug abuse, living with HIV/AIDS, and ultimately discovering himself as a mystic and philosopher. The philosopher and psychologist Ken Wilber wrote a column for BeliefNet over a year before the book's publication, in which he compared Perez to the French dramatist Antonin Artaud, in that he "rescued his life from disaster by turning it into art."

Perez's primary insight, according to Toby Johnson, is defining what he calls "The Importance of Being Gay." In a series of short essays he argues that there are four major patterns, archetypal and universal: masculine, feminine, other-directed, and same-directed. In Perez's philosophy, Love is said to be a manifestation of the soul's desire to be reunited with God both as love for others (heterophilia) and love for the self or similar (homophilia). Perez himself, in a dialogue with Ken Wilber published by Integral Naked, said that he views the autobiographical climax of his book to be a reflection of homophilia in its positive and negative forms, Love (Agape) and Fear (Thanatos).

He lives in Seattle, Washington.

== As author ==
- Soulfully Gay: How Harvard, Sex, Drugs, and Integral Philosophy Drove Me Crazy and Brought Me Back to God
- Rising Up: Reflections on Gay Culture, Politics, Spirit
