= Victor Villaseñor =

American writer (born 1940)

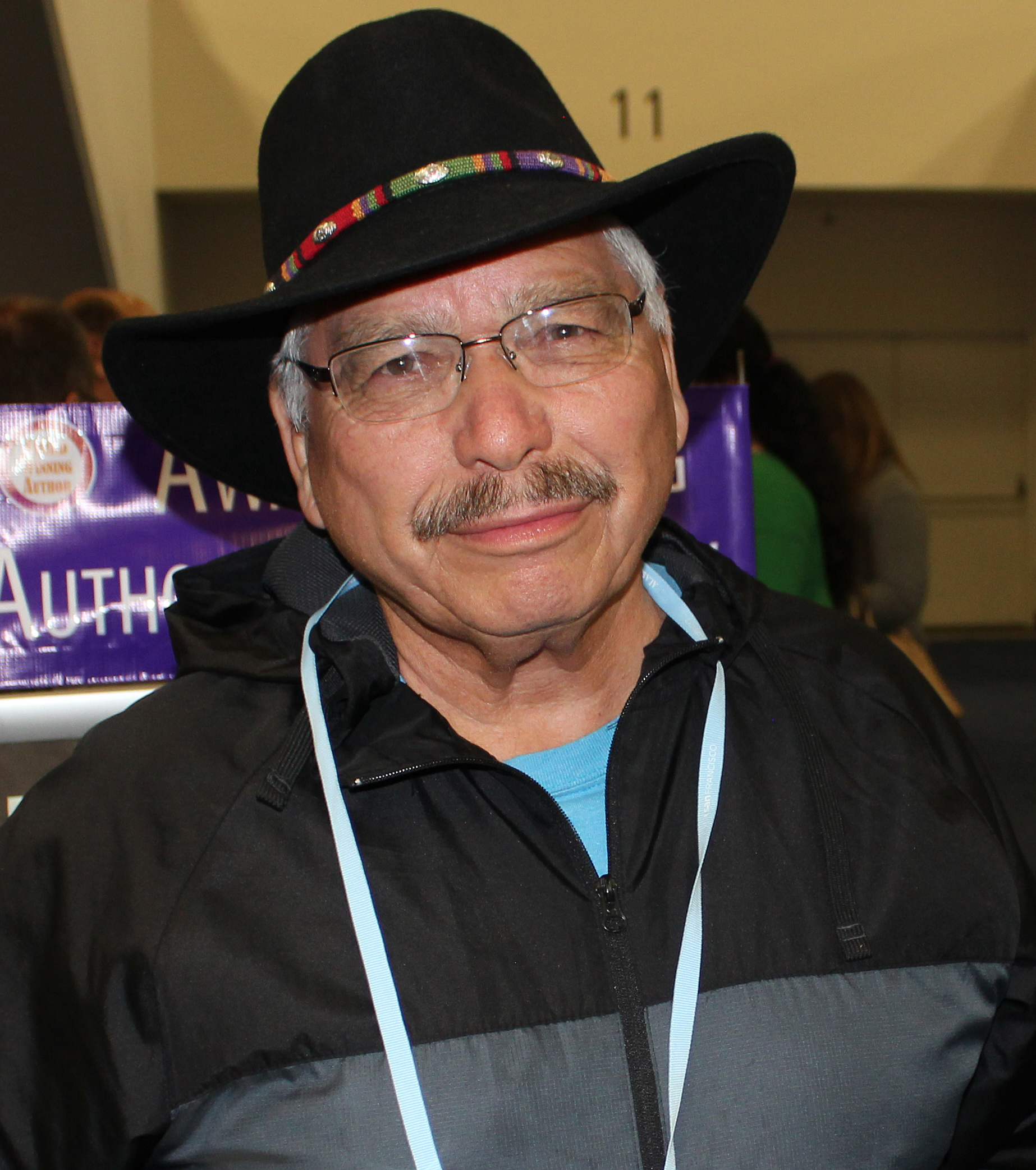
- Villaseñor in 2015
- Born: May 11, 1940 (age 86); Carlsbad, California, U.S.
- Occupation: Author
- Writing career
- Genres: Fiction, Non-fiction
- Notable works: Macho! Rain of Gold; Burro Genius: A Memoir; Lion Eyes
- Website: victorvillasenor.com

Victor Villaseñor (born May 11, 1940) is an American writer, best known for the national bestselling book Rain of Gold. Villaseñor's works are often taught in American schools. He went on to write Thirteen Senses: A Memoir (2001), a continuation of Rain of Gold. His book Burro Genius: A Memoir (2004) describes his life. The author has received awards and endorsements, including an appointment to serve as the founding Steinbeck Chair at Hartnell College and the National Steinbeck Center in Salinas, from February 2003 to March 2004.

== Lecturing ==
Villaseñor is also a public speaker, giving lectures with his perspective on a number of universal themes, including pride in heritage, strength of family, the power of the written word, dedication to education and personal achievement, and world peace.

He founded the non-profit organization Snowgoose Global Thanksgiving to help promote peace and harmony throughout the world. Villaseñor's self-published book, Snow Goose: Global Thanksgiving, describes his philosophy toward that eventuality.

Victor Villaseñor lives on the ranch where he grew up, in Oceanside, California. He is Mexican-American.

== See also ==
- List of Mexican-American writers

== Bibliography ==
- Macho!, Houston: Arte Publico Press, 1991 edition ISBN 1-55885-027-9.
- Rain of Gold, Houston: Arte Publico Press, 1991 ISBN 1-55885-030-9.
- Wild Steps of Heaven, New York: Delacorte Press, 1996 ISBN 0-385-31566-X.
- Thirteen Senses: A Memoir, New York: Rayo, 2001 ISBN 0-06-008686-6.
- Burro Genius: A Memoir, New York: Rayo, 2006 ISBN 0-06-052612-2.
- The Frog and His Friends Save Humanity (La Rana y Sus Amigos Salvan a la Humanidad), (Spanish translation Edna Ochoa), Houston: Pinata Books/Arte Publico Press, 2005 ISBN 1-55885-429-0.
- Lion Eyes, Random House Digital, Inc., 2008 ISBN 978-0-345-47617-3.
- Crazy Loco Love, Houston: Arte Publico Press, 2008 ISBN 978-1-58270-272-8.

== Bibliographical Resources ==
https://faculty.ucmerced.edu/mmartin-rodriguez/index_files/vhVillasenorVictor.htm
