= Arte Público Press =

Publisher of literature by US Hispanic authors

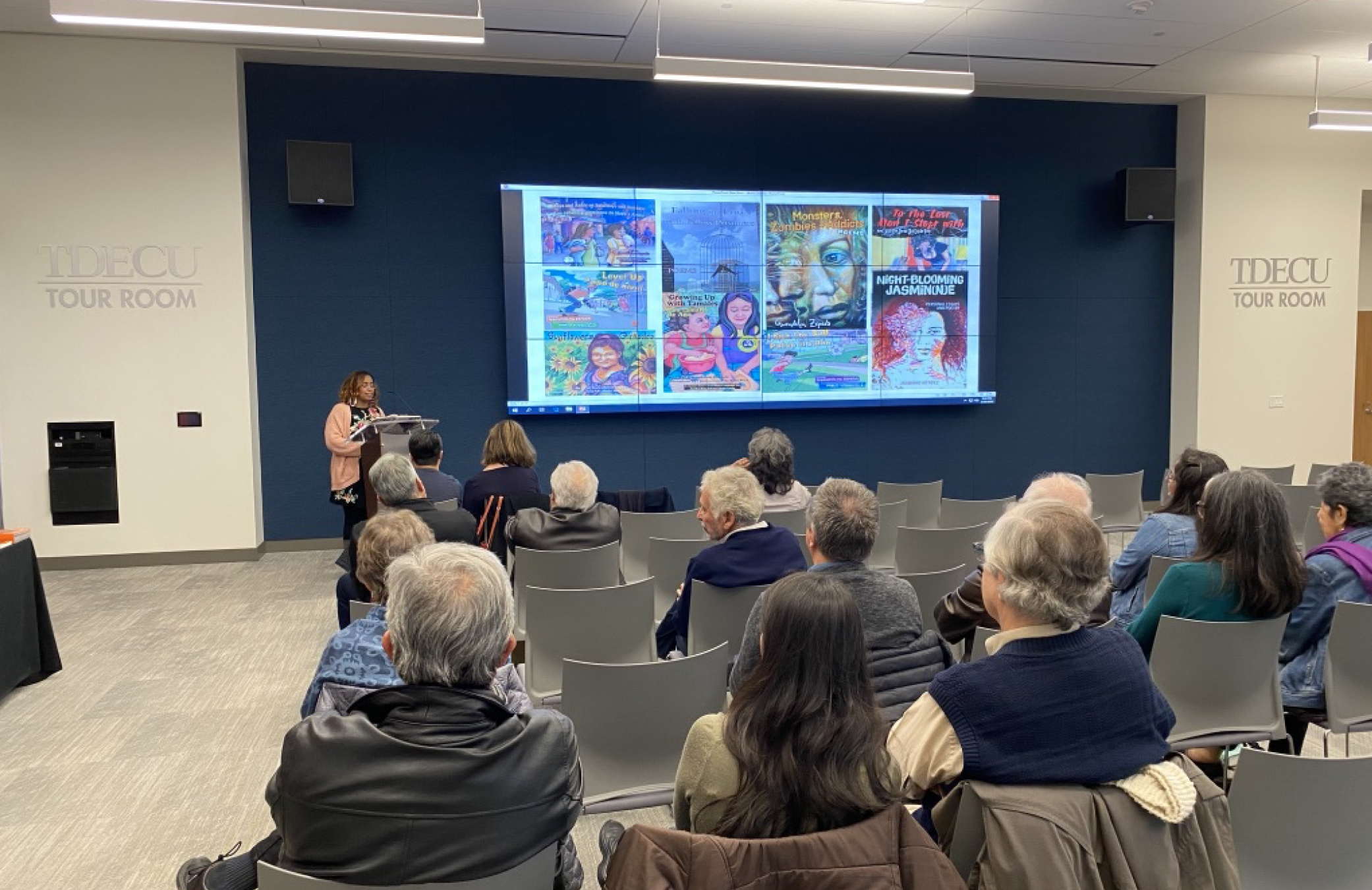
- Jasminne Mendez reading her poetry at a meeting, February 20, 2020
- Parent company: University of Houston
- Founded: 1979
- Founder: Nicolás Kanellos
- Successor: Gabriela Baeza
- Country of origin: United States
- Headquarters location: Houston
- Publication types: Books
- Imprints: Piñata
- Official website: www.artepublicopress.com

Arte Público Press is a publishing house associated with the University of Houston (Houston, Texas). It is the largest US publisher of contemporary and recovered literature by Hispanic-American authors, publishing approximately 30 titles per year.

== History ==
Arte Público was founded in 1979 by its former director, Nicolás Kanellos, who taught Hispanic literature at Indiana University Northwest during the Chicano Movement. Already having established himself as co-founder and editor of Revista Chicana-Riqueña since 1973, he was motivated by communal concern regarding publishing accessibility. In 1980, he accepted a position at the University of Houston, which integrated Arte Público.

In 1990, Arte Público launched the "Recovering the U.S. Hispanic Literary Heritage" project in order to recover, index and publish lost Latino writings dating from the American colonial period to 1960. By 1991, the press published approximately 25 books annually, with about 40% of their material being used as textbooks. In 1994, they created Piñata Books, their children's and young adult literature imprint. By 1997, it published 20 books.

Arte Público Press was honored with the 2018 Ivan Sandrof Lifetime Achievement Award given by the National Book Critics Circle Award for their work in publishing Latino authors.

In August 2025, Gabriela Baeza was appointed Director of Arte Público Press, succeeding founder Nicolás Kanellos. She has been affiliated with Arte Público Press for several decades, contributing to its mission of promoting Latino and Hispanic literature in the United States.

The press is a member of the Community of Literary Magazines and Presses (CLMP).

== Recovering the U.S. Hispanic Literary Heritage ==
In 1990 an initial meeting was held to establish Recovering the U.S. Hispanic Literary Heritage, also known as The Recovery Project. This project seeks to recover and expand access to manuscripts and printed materials created by Hispanics in the United States from colonial times to 1960. The Rockefeller Foundation funded the initial meeting and the first decade of operation, along with numerous other foundations including Andrew W. Mellon Foundation, Houston Endowment Inc., and the Ford Foundation. Over 18,000 pamphlets and books written by Hispanics have been located. 1,000 books have been digitized, and over 500,000 literary items have been digitized from 1,700 periodicals.

== Notable publications ==
- The House on Mango Street by Sandra Cisneros
- Zoot Suit and Other Plays by Luis Valdez
- Rain of Gold by Victor Villaseñor
- Chants by Pat Mora
- y no se lo tragó la tierra (And the Earth Did Not Devour Him) by Tomás Rivera
- Chavoya, C. Ondine (2006). Women Boxers: The New Warriors. Delilah Montoya (photography), María Teresa Márquez (contributor). Arte Público Press, University of Houston. ISBN 9781611923360.
- The Adventures of Don Chipote by Daniel Venegas

== Notable authors ==
- Lamberto Alvarez
- C. Ondine Chavoya
- Victor Villaseñor
- Nicholasa Mohr
- Luis Valdez
- Miguel Piñero
- Sandra Cisneros
- Julia Alvarez
- Helena Maria Viramontes
- Sergio Troncoso
- Miguel Algarín
- Graciela Limón
- Gwendolyn Zepeda
- Daniel Olivas
- Daniel Chacón,
- Pat Mora
- Richard A. Tapia
- José Ángel Gutiérrez
