= Chicano literature =

Aspect of Mexican-American literature

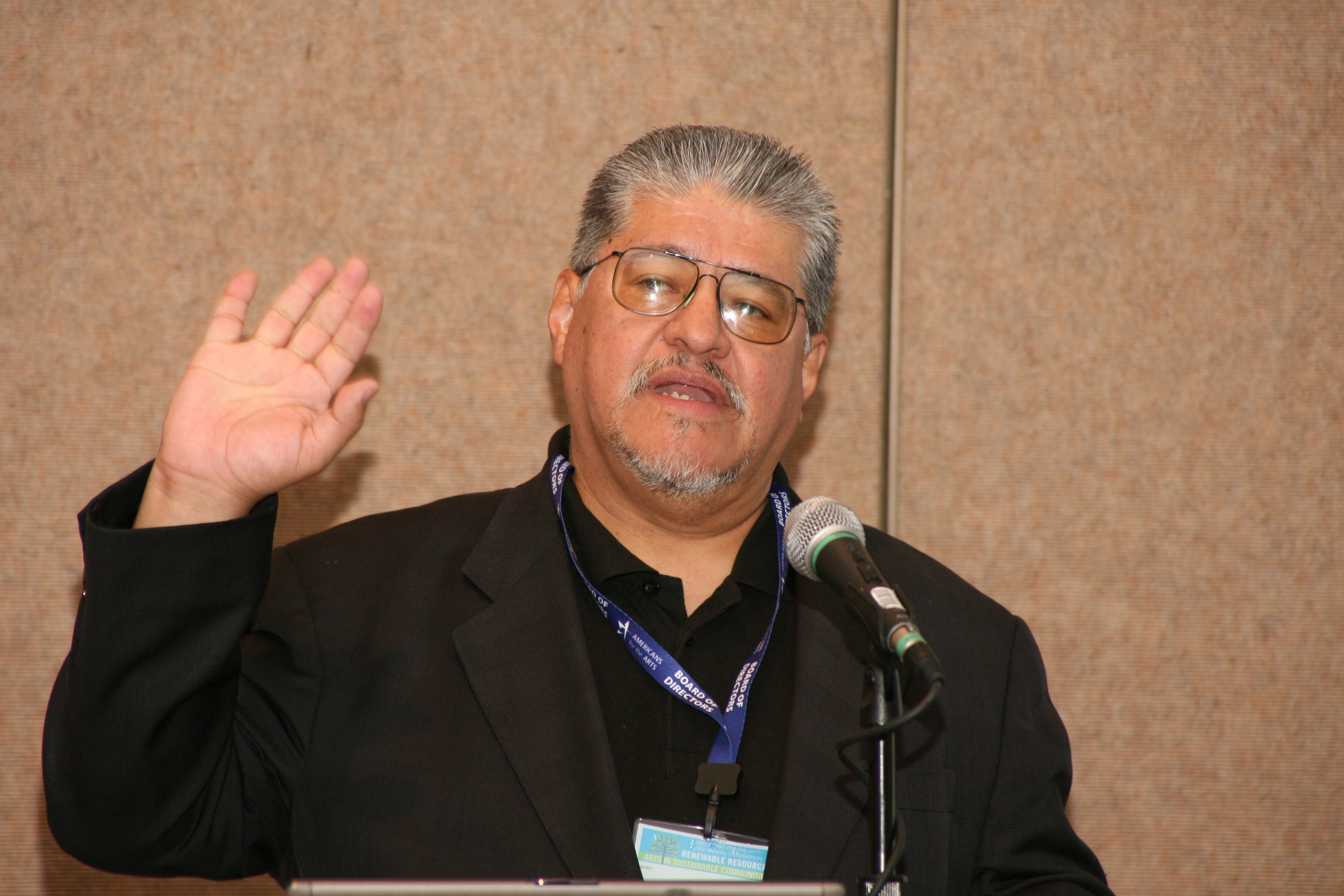
Luis J. Rodriguez (2009)

Chicano literature is an aspect of Mexican-American literature that emerged from the cultural consciousness developed in the Chicano Movement. Chicano literature formed out of the political and cultural struggle of Chicana/os to develop a political foundation and identity that rejected Anglo-American hegemony. This literature embraced the pre-Columbian roots of Mexican-Americans, especially those who identify as Chicana/os.

Chicano literature first emerged in the mid-1960s and is notable for its early embrace of Spanglish in published literature as well as its use of hybrid forms and styles. Chicana/o writers often include earlier published literature as residing within or as being a precursor to the tradition. In addition to prose, Chicano poetry and playwriting are included as forms of Chicano literature.

== History ==
=== Chicano literature in the Chicano Movement ===
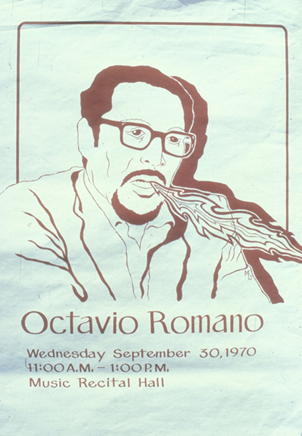
Octavio Romano helped establish Quinto Sol in 1967. It was the first publisher focused on Chicano literature.

Chicano prose was established as a distinct literary tradition in the mid-1960s. José Antonio Villarreal’s Pocho (1959) is commonly cited as the first widespread Chicano novel. Poets and writers in the 1960s defined themselves in their own terms, different from the white Anglo-Saxon protestant gaze that, as written by Alurista, sought to "keep Mexicans in their place."

The first publishing house dedicated to Chicana/o writers was Quinto Sol, which was established in 1967 by Andres Ybarra, Nick Vaca, and Octavio Romano. Early works which became benchmark's in the field of Chicano literature were Tomás Rivera’s ...y no se lo trago la tierra (1971) and Rudolfo Anaya's Bless Me, Ultima (1972). Bless Me, Ultima used colloquial Spanglish in its linguistic form and inspired others to develop their own approach to Chicana/o themes. Anaya is sometimes cited as the 'father' of Chicano literature.

In a 1979 essay on Chicano literature, Arnulfo D. Trejo wrote that this literature was important in establishing a unique self-image for the Chicano: "the Chicano self-portrait is long overdue." Trejo outline six qualities of the Chicano novel or narrative fiction:

1. Social and political autonomy for La Raza
2. True-to-life experiences of the Chicana/o
3. Focused on the contemporary, yet grounded in history
4. Characters are real or relatable people
5. Use of English and Spanish
6. A greater message for the reader

By these criteria, in 1977 he named the following works as examples of Chicano novels: Chicano (1970) by Richard Vasquez, Rivera's ...y no se lo trago la tierra (1971), (3) Anaya's Bless Me, Ultima (1972), and Peregrinos de Aztlán (1974) by Miguel Méndez. Aside from narrative fiction, other notable works included Abelardo Delgado's poetry in 25 Pieces of a Chicano Mind (1969), Oscar Zeta Acosta's autobiographies The Autobiography of a Brown Buffalo (1972) and The Revolt of the Cockroach People (1973). In 1977, Trejo acknowledged that there was an "omission of Chicano women in Chicano literature."

=== Chicana literary developments ===
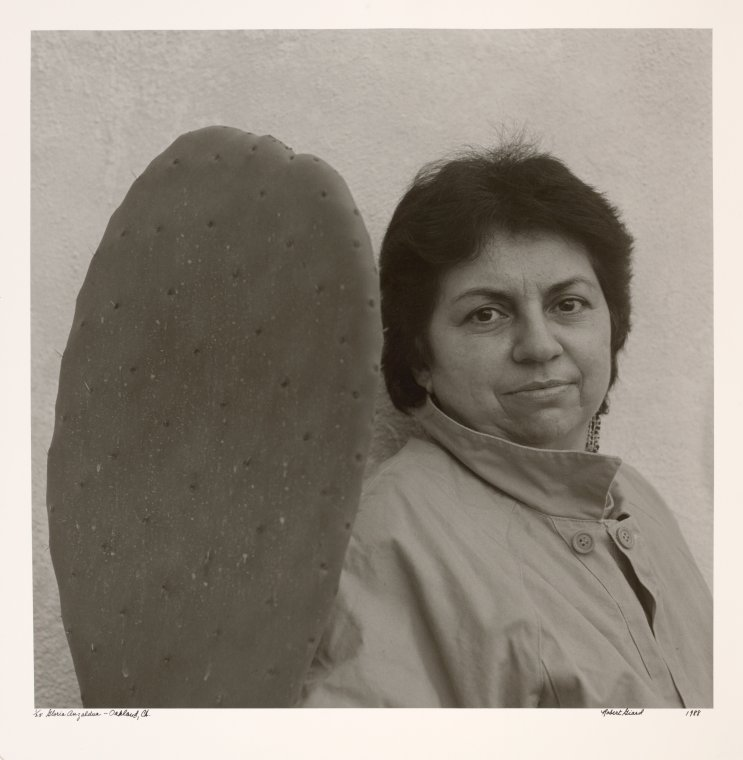
Gloria Anzaldúa. Oakland, Ca. 1988, queer Chicana poet author of Borderlands/La Frontera: The New Mestiza (1987).

Chicana literature is a form of literature that has emerged from the Chicana Feminist movement. It aims to redefine Chicana archetypes, in an effort to provide positive models for Chicanas. Chicana writers redefine their relationships with what Gloria Anzaldúa has called "Las Tres Madres" of Mexican culture (i.e. Our Lady of Guadalupe, La Malinche, and La Llorona), by depicting them as feminist sources of strength and compassion.

According to the Encyclopedia of Race, Ethnicity and Society, "Chicana feminist writings helped to develop a discourse in opposition to the Eurocentric frameworks." Chicana writing grew out of Chicana feminism, through the feminist journals founded since the 1960s – one of which led to Norma Alarcón's Third Woman Press, the assertions of Chicana feminism in essays, and the portrayal of the gender crisis in the Chicano Movement in the poetry and fiction of Chicana authors.

=== Indigenous thematic developments ===
In the 1960s and 1970s, Chicano literature tended to primarily focus on a connection with Aztec history and culture, particularly through the homeland of Aztlán. One exception was Pensamiento Serpentino (1973) by Luis Valdez, which drew on the Mayan concept of In Lak'ech ("you are the other me").

Later developments in the 1980s and 1990s, particularly by Chicana authors, began to expand this focus to include many different Indigenous peoples of Mexico and connected to their struggles. Novels by Estela Portillo-Trambley and Graciela Limón referenced Rarámuri ancestry. Lucha Corpi and others referenced Yaqui ancestry. Ana Castillo and Chicano poet Juan Felipe Herrera have referenced Mayan ancestry and themes in their work.

== Forms and styles ==
=== Chicano prose ===
Chicano prose is unique as a literary tradition for its strong embrace of hybridity in both its form and style. This often meant the inclusion or embrace of Spanish or Spanglish, the use of themes related to magical realism, and an integration of different literary genres into one work, such as fiction and autobiography.

=== Chicano poetry ===
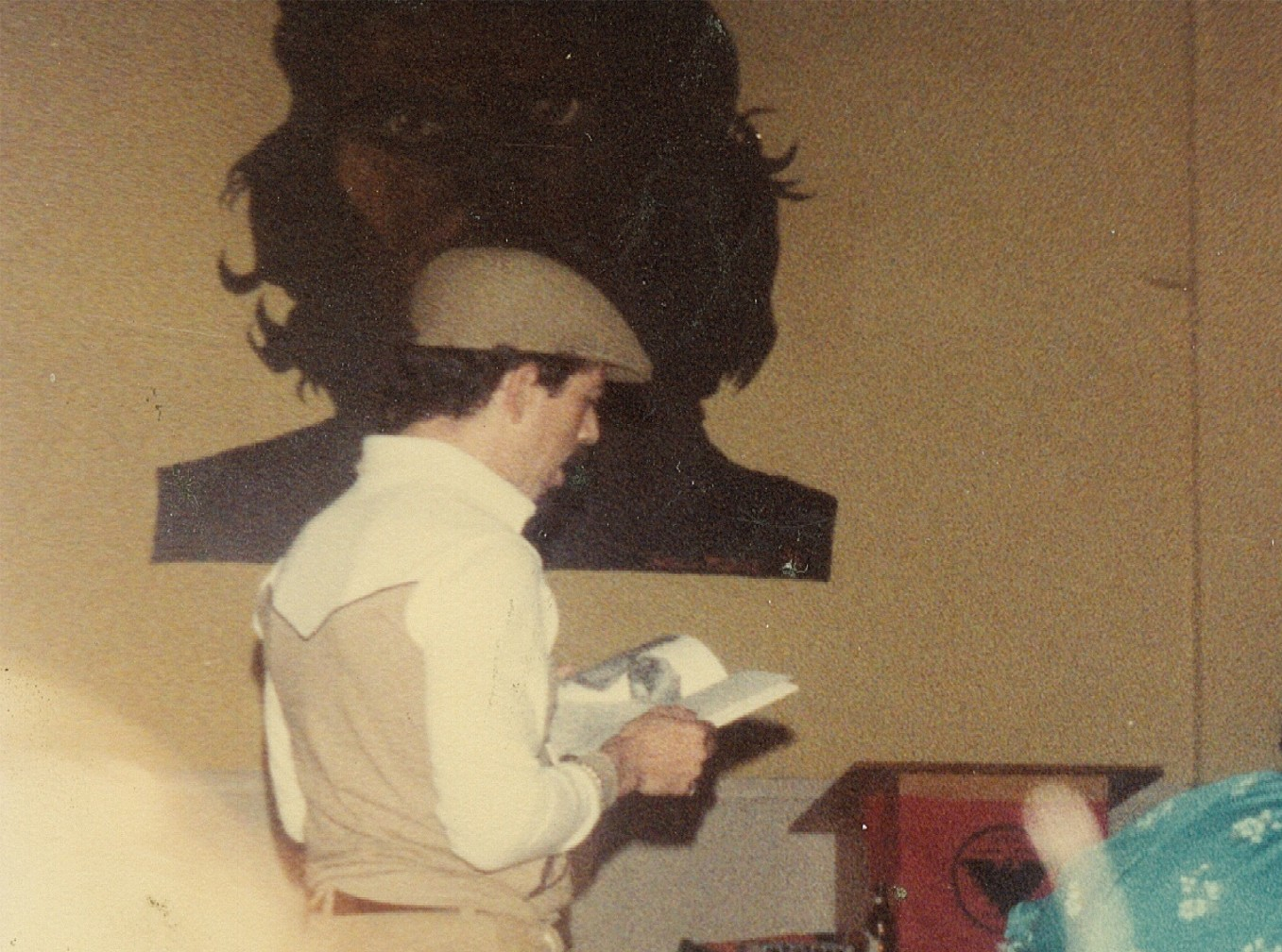
Chicano poet Alurista performing a poetry reading (1982)

Chicano poetry is a subgenre of Chicano literature that stems from the cultural consciousness developed in the Chicano Movement. Chicano poetry has its roots in the reclamation of Chicana/o as an identity of empowerment rather than denigration. As a literary field, Chicano poetry emerged in the 1960s and formed its own independent literary current and voice.

=== Chicano playwriting ===
Chicano playwriting emerged in the 1960s firstly through the work of Luis Valdez with Teatro Campesino. Chicano playwriting emerged with a dedication to the farmworker's political struggle for rights. Valdez himself stated: "We don’t think in terms of art," but in terms of message to the audience. By 1973, there were about thirty Chicano theater groups, including Teatro de la Esperanza under Jorge A. Huerta.

In March 2026, Dog-Eat-Dog Theatre Company staged an academically-researched, absurdist Chicanx play titled 'Your Land', with inspiration taken from Luis Valdez.
