= Chicano poetry =

Subgenre of Mexica-American literature

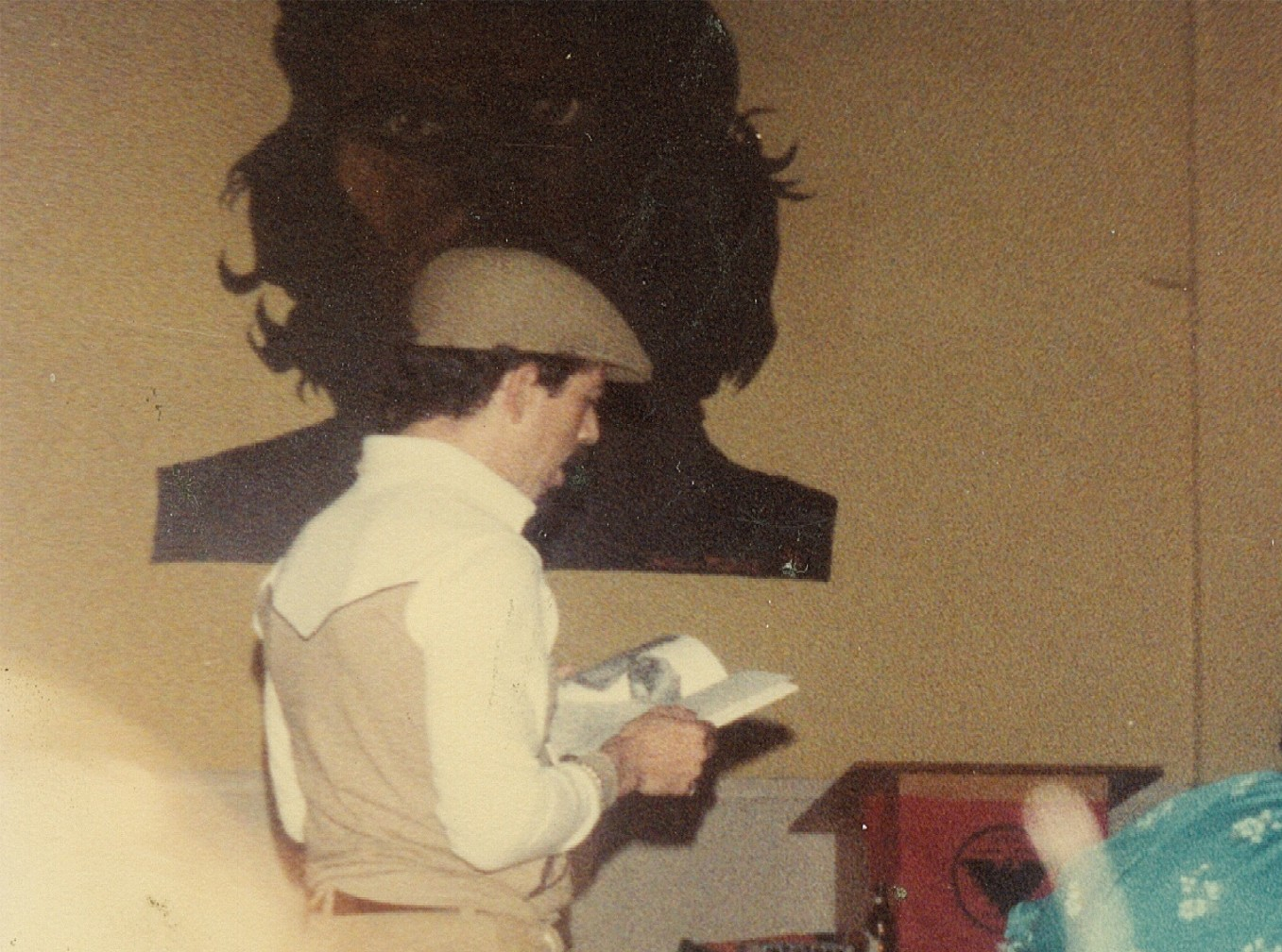
Chicano poet Alurista performing a poetry reading (1982)

Chicano poetry is a subgenre of Chicano literature that stems from the cultural consciousness developed in the Chicano Movement. Chicano poetry has its roots in the reclamation of Chicana/o as an identity of empowerment rather than denigration. As a literary field, Chicano poetry emerged in the 1960s and formed its own independent literary current and voice.

== History ==
=== Poetics of the Chicano Movement ===
The Chicano Movement inspired the development of a poetic current among the Mexican Americans who embraced Chicana/o identity. Chicanos and Chicanas both addressed marginalization, racism and vanquished dreams in the United States. Many Chicana/o poets retold the history of Mexican Americans that differed from the dominant narrative of mainstream Anglo-Americans. The surge of creative literary activity among Chicana/o authors in the 1960s and 1970s became known as the Florecimiento, or Renaissance.

==== Chicano poets in the Chicano Movement ====
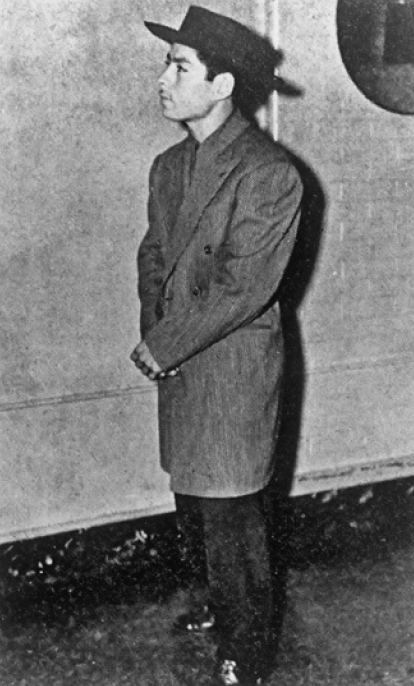
Chicano poets reclaimed the Pachuco, who was historically framed negatively, as a figure of empowerment.

Chicano poets focused on the effects of racism on the Chicana/o community and the perseverance of Chicanos to maintain their cultural, political, and social identity. Nephtalí De León was one early pioneer, writing a poetry book Chicanos in the early 1960s as well as the poems "Hey, Mr. President, Man!," "Coca Cola Dream," and "Chicano Popcorn."

Chicano poets reframed the Pachuco figure of the 1940s, who was historically looked down upon by the Mexican American community. One of the most notable poems to do this was “El Louie” by José Montoya. For Chicano poets, this was true to a lesser extent for the Pachuca figure, who was embraced mainly as a lover to the Pachuco.

Abelardo "Lalo" Delgado's poem "Stupid America" written in the 1960s discussed the poor treatment of Chicanos and their erasure as artists, poets, and visionaries who are not permitted by the American mainstream to reach their potential. Rodolfo "Corky" Gonzales' poem "Yo Soy Joaquin" was widely influential, being adapted into a 1969 film by Luis Valdez of the same name. The poem reviewed the exploitation of the Chicano:

Yo soy Joaquín,
perdido en un mundo de confusión:
I am Joaquín, lost in a world of confusion,
caught up in the whirl of a gringo society,
confused by the rules, scorned by attitudes,
suppressed by manipulation, and destroyed by modern society.
My fathers have lost the economic battle
and won the struggle of cultural survival.

==== Chicana poets in the Chicano Movement ====
Chicana poets challenged the role of women in the community through their poetry and spoke to a variety of issues. Chicana feminist poets used poetry to express their views of aggressive masculine pride or machismo, which had excluded them from the movement. This included the poem "Machismo Is Part of Our Culture" by Marcela Christine Lucero-Trujillo.

In the interwar period, unmarried Mexican American women were often mandated by their families to be accompanied by a male when going out, who would watch over them throughout the night. A woman's purity was linked to the family's reputation and a chaperone was sent to watch on their daughter's activities. Women sought freedom yet also sought to be good daughters to their families. Chicana feminist poets addressed this in their work, such as "Pueblo, 1950" (1976) by Bernice Zamora, who discussed the consequences young, unmarried, Mexican-American women would face from a simple kiss:

I remember you, Fred Montoya
You were the first vato to ever kiss me
I was twelve years old.
my mother said shame on you,
my teacher said shame on you, and
I said shame on me, and nobody
said a word to you.

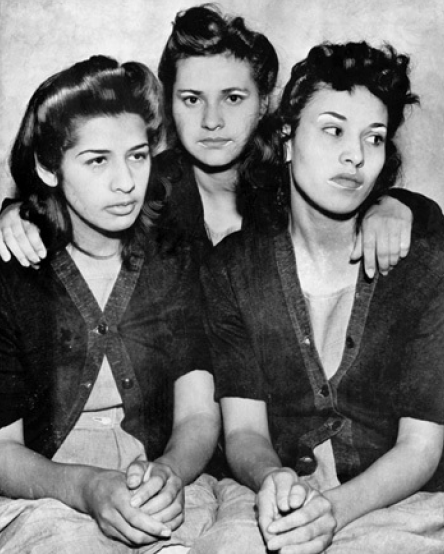
Pachucas have been valorized in the works of Chicana/o poets, including Inés Hernández-Ávila's poem "Para Teresa."

Chicana poet Inés Hernández-Ávila valorized the Pachuca in her poem "Para Teresa." Other poets who reframed the Pachuca figure were Alurista, José Montoya, and raúlrsalinas. Poems the reframed the Pachuca also included “Los Corts (5 voices)” and “and when I dream dreams” by Carmen Tafolla, and “Later, She Met Joyce” by Cherríe Moraga.

An example of Chicana poetry is “La Nueva Chicana” by poet Viola Correa,

Hey
She that lady protesting injustice,
Es mi Mamà
The girl in the brown beret,
The one teaching the children,
She’s my hermana
Over there fasting with the migrants,
Es mi tía.
These are the women who worry,
Pray, iron
And cook chile y tortillas.
The lady with the forgiving eyes
And the gentle smile.
Listen to her shout.
She knows what hardship is all about
All about.
The Establishment calls her a radical militant.
The newspapers read she is
A dangerous subversive
They label her name to condemn her.
By the FBI she’s called
A big problem.
In Aztlàn we call her
La Nueva Chicana.

=== Chicana/o poetics, post-Chicano Movement ===
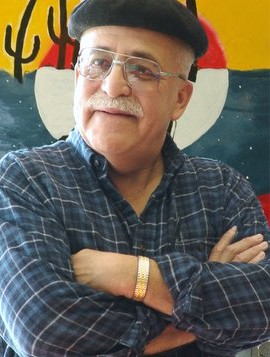
Trinidad Sanchez Jr.'s "Why Am I So Brown?" discussed issues of childhood internalization of colorism.

While the Chicano Movement itself experienced a decline by the late 1970s, poets who embraced Chicana/o identity continued to carry the consciousness of the movement forward through their poetry. Trinidad "Trino" Sánchez's "Why Am I So Brown?" (1991). The poem was inspired by the daughter of one of his friend's experience of colorism for her darker skin color, when she came home asking her father the question.

The latter part of the 20th century saw the emergence of Juan Felipe Herrera as a dominant force in the genre. In Herrera's works, cultural expression is shown from the 1960s to the present. His poetry is most known for being willful, expressing a unique voice.

== Themes ==
Chicana/o poets continue to address experiences of racism in the United States. A strong undercurrent among Chicana/o poets is planting the community's roots in Mesoamerican civilizations and how the indigenous people of those civilizations continue to live through the Chicano people who are predominantly of mestizo (mixed) ancestry. For example, Chicana poet Lucha Corpi published a collection of poetry authored "LLuvia/Rain." This work creates a framework on cultural remembrance with an emphasis on the sensuality of rain referencing the Nahua god of rain (tlaloc).

Chicana poets continue to expand on the theme of marginalization beyond only focusing on racism and marginalization. Chicana poets also focus on themes of sexual abuse, misogyny, and the creation of a complex Chicana identity. The great thematic diversity of the field is owed to the many reflections of Chicano/a poets.

== Awards ==
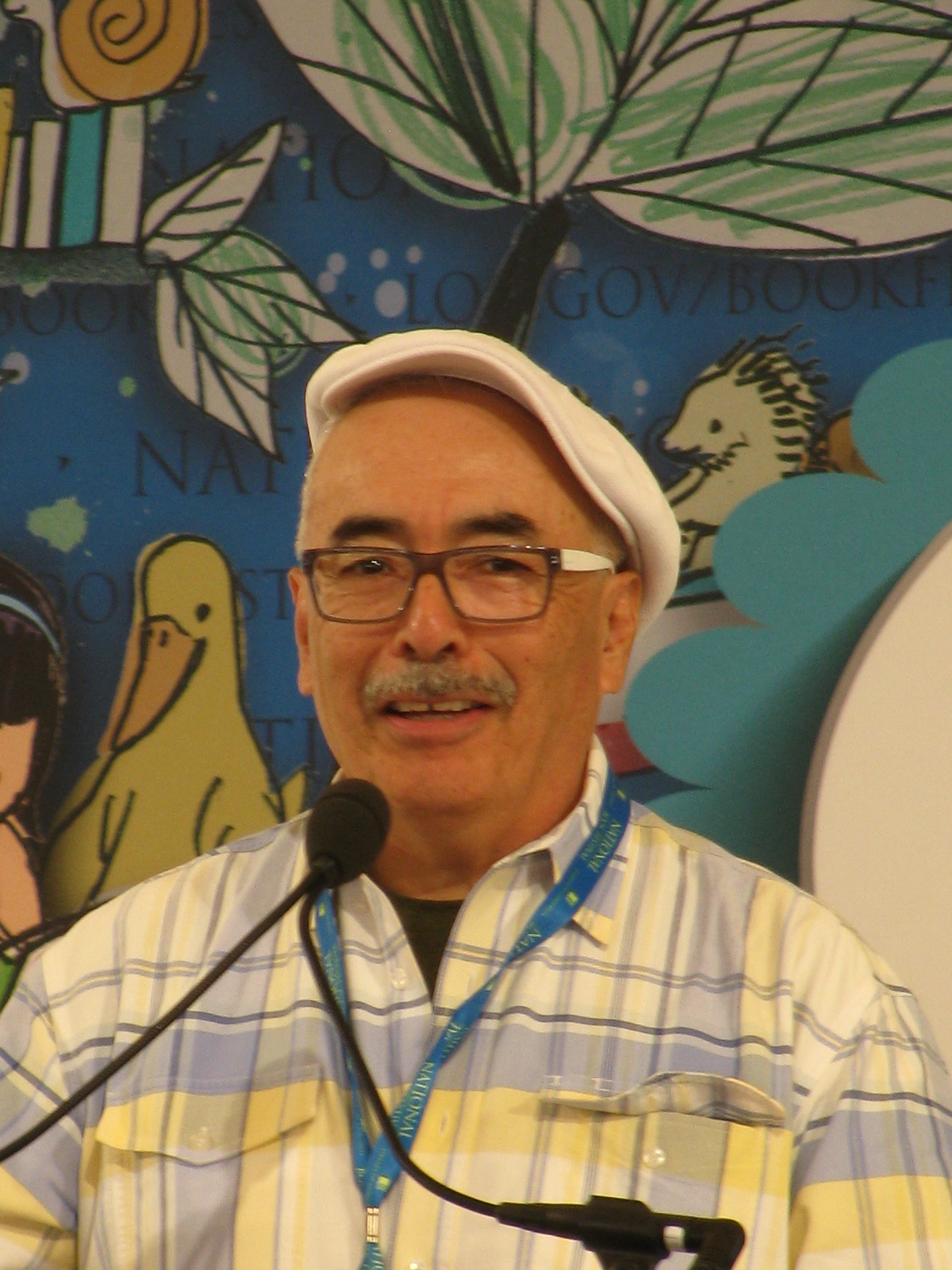
In 2015, Juan Felipe Herrera became the first Chicano or Latino United States Poet Laureate.

- In 2012, Juan Felipe Herrera was named the Poet Laureate of California.
- In 2015, Carmen Tafolla was named the Poet Laureate of Texas.
- In 2015, Juan Felipe Herrera became the first Chicano and Latino more broadly to be appointed United States Poet Laureate.
- In 2016, Laurie Ann Guerrero was named the Poet Laureate of Texas.
- In 2020, Emmy Pérez was named the Poet Laureate of Texas.
- In 2023, ire’ne lara silva was named the Poet Laureate of Texas.

== Important publishers ==
A handful of U.S. publishers specialize in Chicano poetry, including the following:

- Arte Publico Press
- Aztlan Libre Press
- Bilingual Review Press
- Chiricú
- Cinco Puntos Press
- University of Arizona Press

== List of major Chicano poets ==
- Lucha Corpi
- Gloria E. Anzaldúa
- Ana Castillo
- Lorna Dee Cervantes
- Sandra Cisneros
- Carlos Cumpian
- Ray Gonzalez
- Daniel Olivas
- Rodolfo "Corky" Gonzales
- Juan Felipe Herrera
- Javier O. Huerta
- Tino Villanueva

== See also ==
- Mexican-American literature
- History of Mexican Americans
- La Raza
- Chicana feminism
- Chicano art movement
- American literature in Spanish
- Latino poetry
- Latino literature
