= Luis Leal (writer) =

Mexican-American writer and literary critic

- Born: September 17, 1907; Linares, Nuevo León, Mexico
- Died: January 25, 2010 (aged 102); Santa Barbara, California, U.S.
- Education: Northwestern University (BA); University of Chicago (Ph.D.)
- Occupations: Writer, professor, literary critic

Luis Leal (Linares, Nuevo León, September 17, 1907 – Santa Barbara, California, January 25, 2010) was a Mexican-American writer and literary critic.

== Biography ==
Born into a family that had participated in the Mexican Revolution, Leal lived in the United States beginning in 1927, studying at Northwestern University. There, in 1936, he met his future wife Gladys Clemens, with whom he had two sons, Antonio and Luis Alfonso. In 1939 he was naturalized as an American citizen. After serving in the Philippines during the Second World War, he resumed his literary studies at the University of Chicago, where in 1950 he acquired a doctorate in Spanish and Italian literature.

Leal was a pioneer in the field of Latin-American and Chicano literature. He taught briefly at the University of Mississippi, but uncomfortable with racial segregation transferred to Emory University and later to the University of Illinois before finally accepting a post at the University of California, Santa Barbara in 1976. There he directed the Center for Chicano Studies from 1994 to 1996. He lectured as a guest professor at various universities and continued his academic career until well into his nineties. He published articles in Cuadernos Americanos and Historia Mexicana, and edited Ventana Abierta: Revista Latina de Literatura, Arte y Cultura. He was especially interested in Mexican storytelling, particularly the work of Mariano Azuela and Juan Rulfo, contributing substantially to the Encyclopedia of Latino Folklore. He authored some 45 books and more than four hundred articles. Among his students were the hispanists Merlin Foster, Sara Poot-Herrera, Francisco Lomelí, and María Herrera-Sobek.

Leal was one of the first professors to incorporate the writers of the Latin American Boom (i.e. Gabriel García Márquez, Carlos Fuentes, and Julio Cortázar) into his curriculum. He also introduced American scholarship to the works of Amado Nervo, Mariano Azuela, Rafael Muñoz, and Martín Luis Guzmán. With respect to Chicano literature, he promoted the study of Tomás Rivera, Rolando Hinojosa, Sandra Cisneros, Alurista, and Rudolfo Anaya.

A member of the Modern Language Association of America, Leal received the National Humanities Medal and was honored by the National Association for Chicano Studies in 1988. In 1991 he received the Order of the Aztec Eagle.

== Works ==
- With Carlos Castillo, Anthology of Mexican Literature, 1944.
- Editor of Cuentecitos: Retold and Adapted from the Spanish of Vicente Riva Palacio, 1944.
- El Periquillo Sarmiento, 1946.
- México: civilizaciones y culturas, 1955, rev. 1971.
- Breve historia del cuento mexicano, 1957, 1990.
- Edición de Antología del cuento mexicano, 1957.
- Bibliografía del cuento mexicano, 1958.
- Mariano Azuela, vida y obra, 1961.
- Panorama de la literature mexicana actual, 1968.
- Breve historia de la literature hispanoamericana, 1971.
- Mariano Azuela, 1971.
- Corridos y canciones de Aztlán, 1980, 1986.
- Juan Rulfo, 1983.
- Aztlán y México: Perfiles literarios e históricos, 1985.
- No Longer Voiceless, 1995.
- With Victor Fuentes: Don Luis Leal: Una vida y dos culturas. Conversaciones con Victor Fuentes, 1998.
- With Mario T. García: Luis Leal: An Auto/Biography, 2000.
