= Quinto Sol =

Chicano independent publishing house

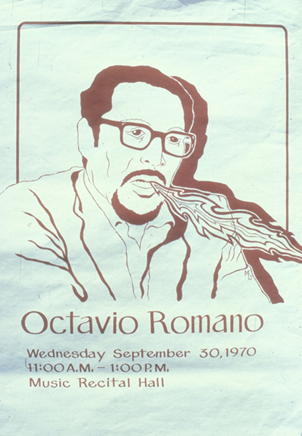
- Octavio Romano, founder of Quinto Sol (1970)
- Industry: Independent Publisher
- Founded: 1967; 58 years ago at UC Berkeley
- Founder: Andres Ybarra; Nick C. Vaca; Prof. Octavio I. Romano
- Defunct: 1974
- Fate: Dissolved
- Products: El Grito: A Journal of Contemporary Mexican-American Thought

Quinto Sol was the first fully independent publishing house to surface from the Chicano movement in the Sixties. Editorial Quinto Sol (Quinto Sol Publications) was founded in 1967 at UC Berkeley by Octavio I. Romano, a professor of Behavioral Science and Public Health, in collaboration with Nick C. Vaca and Andres Ybarra. The name "Quinto Sol" is Spanish for "Fifth Sun" and it refers to the Aztec myth of creation and destruction. Since the beginning of the Chicano movement in the 1960s, this concept has become a pathway to cultural expression. The Fifth Sun has constantly been integrated into the music, art and literature of the Chicano idea.

The goals of the publication house included "cultural unity and self-determination" and the publishing house, its authors, and the works they produced were centrally important in the Chicano Movement in the 1970s. Aiming to create an academic and literary outlet for Chicano voices, it originated from the movement's need of an unbiased artistic venue for Mexican American authors. Literary nationalism was, after all, the driving cultural force behind "El Movimiento" (Chicano Movement) at the end of the 1960s

== Publishing ==
Beginning in 1967, Quinto Sol published the interdisciplinary El Grito: A Journal of Contemporary Mexican-American Thought. This was the first national academic and literary journal ever published in the United States. The journal, whose name is Spanish for "the Shout," was "intended to raise awareness at what we could call a pan-Chicano/a nationalistic level". Considered an intellectual and independent critical space, it became a place where Chicano(a) scholars, authors and artists could work to debunk the "culture of poverty" and other negative stereotypes attributed to Mexican Americans by scientists, other literature works and the media. As the editorial developed, the journal was used to expand Chicano expression and self-definition.

The authors published in El Grito drew attention to the biases in academic realms regarding Mexican-Americans and attempted to rectify these blind spots. Quinto Sol released Voices: Readings from El Grito: A Journal of Contemporary Mexican-American Thought, which was a compilation of the most important works published in the journal. A second expanded edition of Voices was published two years later. The texts became an important resource for those wanting to learn about the newly instituted discipline of Chicano Studies. El Grito also published advertisements geared towards high schools and other university departments to stress the importance of Quinto Sol materials in the classroom. Finally, in 1969, Quinto Sol released the first edition of El espejo--The Mirror, the first anthology of Mexican-American literature.

The works published by Quinto Sol in the 1970s were often written in Spanish or engaged in code switching between English and Spanish. The Chicano Movement in general, and the works, drew heavily from Anglo-American culture, the experiences of Mexican-Americans, and Aztec mythology. The Quinto Sol publishing house played an essential role in establishing Chicano literature as a distinctive body of work and giving Chicano writers a sense of belonging in a literary community. Quinto Sol contributed to the careers of a number of writers whose work is now recognized as canonical Chicano literature.

== Premio Quinto Sol ==
The Premio Quinto Sol was created in 1970, publishing the work of Chicano and Chicana authors from 1971 to 1975. This was the first literary prize promoted nationally. Awarded to the best fictional work by Mexican American authors as a means of recognizing and promoting Chicano writers. The award involved a cash prize of $1000 and publication of the winning manuscript. The first Premio Quinto Sol was awarded to Tomás Rivera, an associate professor of Spanish at Sam Houston University in Huntsville, Texas, in 1971 for ...y no se lo tragó la tierra (And the Earth Did Not Devour Him). It was published with Quinto Sol as a bilingual edition, the Spanish and English versions printed side to side in the first publications. After being awarded the prize, Rivera worked closely with the Quinto Sol editors throughout the early 1970s. Julio Ramos and Gustavo Buenrostro edited the first Latin American edition of Tomás Rivera's novel ...y no se lo tragó la tierra (1971), which inaugurated a collection of Mexican Literature in Argentina.

In 1972 Rudolfo Anaya won the second Premio Quinto Sol for the novel Bless Me, Ultima. Rolando Hinojosa won the third award for Estampas del Valle y Otras Obras (Sketches of the Valley and Other Works) in 1973. The Premio Quinto Sol literary prize was first awarded to a woman, Estela Portillo Trambley in 1975 for her collection of short stories, Rain of Scorpions.

== Lasting effects ==
The texts distributed by the editorial from 1967 to 1974 have been determined as the most influential works of Chicano authors. The literary awards series, according to the editor's note introducing Bless Me, Ultima, provided a "publishing outlet through which the Chicano artist can express himself through exclusively Chicano means." The authors whose work it published are now an essential part of the Chicano literary and cultural movement.

Through the journal El Grito, the Premio Quinto Sol literary award, and its various other publications, Quinto Sol played a pivotal role in the process of institutionalizing Chicano culture as a legitimate field of inquiry and contributing to the formation of a Chicano(a) literary canon. It served as a self-sustained creative and intellectual space for the participants of "El Movimiento." Simply put, it was a necessary institution for the development of Mexican American nationalism. With it, Chicano authors and their followers were able to forge an autonomous identity, finally making it possible to create a self-defined Chicano community.

After a seven-year run, and the fourth Premio Quinto Sol, the publishing house divided into two separate publishers: Editorial Justa and Tonatiuh International. The latter later became Tonatiuh-Quinto Sol (TQS) Publications.

== Quinto Sol Remembered ==
In 2012, a commemorative organization was founded at the University of California, Berkeley by Gustavo Buenrostro, Javier Huerta, Wanda Alarcón, Joseph Rios and Patricia Velazquez to pay tribute to the literary achievements of Quinto Sol called "Quinto Sol Remembered." On April 6 and 7, 2012 a symposium featuring several Chicano(a) writers and academics took place to commemorate the Chicano publishing house. Important Chicano voices who participated include Alex Saragoza, Alurista, Edel Romay, Gustavo Segade, Hector Calderón, Juan Carrillo, Lorna Dee Cervantes, Lucha Corpi, Malaquías Montoya, Nick Vaca, Rosaura Sánchez, Rudy Anaya (by video), and Sergio Elizondo.
