= Victor Fuentes (academic) =

Spanish-American literary critic

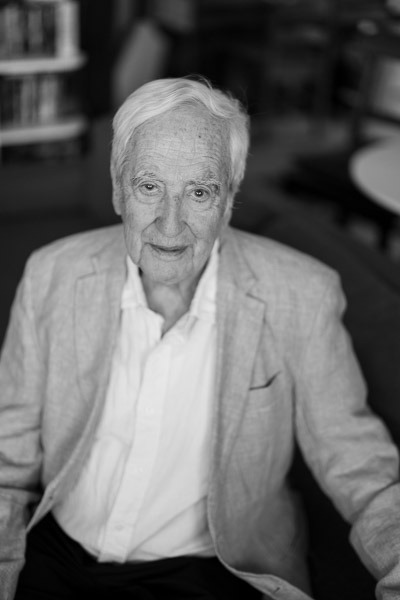
- Born: 1933 (age 92–93) Madrid,Spain
- Occupation: Literary critic; writer; professor
- Education: Universidad Central (now Complutense University); University of New York (BA), (MA, PhD)
- Literary movement: Spanish realism, avant-garde movements, social movements of the 1920s and 1930s
- Years active: 1960–present

Víctor Fuentes (born 1933) is a Spanish-American literary critic, author, and academic, known for his scholarship in Spanish and Latin American literature, film and literature, and Hispanic literary traditions in the United States. He is professor emeritus of Spanish and Portuguese at the University of California, Santa Barbara, a full member of the North American Academy of the Spanish Language, and a corresponding member of the Royal Spanish Academy.

== Early life and education ==
Fuentes was born in Madrid, Spain, and attended the Instituto Cardenal Cisneros before beginning legal studies at the Universidad Central (now Complutense University). In 1954, he left Spain amid political tensions and later emigrated to the United States. He completed a Bachelor of Arts in Romance Languages at the New York University (NYU) in 1959 and earned both a Master's (1961) and a Ph.D. in Romance Languages and Literature (1965) from the same institution.

== Academic career ==
In the early 1960s, Fuentes taught Spanish at Barnard College, Columbia University, and as an instructor at Middlebury College’s summer program in 1962. He joined the Department of Spanish and Portuguese at UCSB in 1965, where he taught 19th- and 20th-century Spanish literature, cinema, theater, and Hispanic literature in the United States until his retirement in 2003.

He also served as department chair and was a visiting professor at the University of California, Berkeley in 1985. He was named professor emeritus in 2003.

In the late 1960s and early 1970s, Fuentes was involved in promoting the establishment of the Department of Chicano-Chicana Studies and the Center for Chicano Studies at UCSB. During the academic year 1971/72, he and two students taught at Lompoc Prison. During the 1980s and 1990s, he directed the Latin American and Iberian Studies Program (LAIS) at UCSB.

== Scholarship ==
Fuentes's research spans Spanish literature of the nineteenth and twentieth centuries, as well as cinema and literature, with insights on Latin American literature. His work places particular emphasis on the writings of Benito Pérez Galdós, Antonio Machado, Benjamín Jarnés, César Vallejo, and the films of Luis Buñuel, along with broader studies of Spanish realism, avant-garde movements, social movements of the 1920s and 1930s, and contemporary postmodernism. His scholarship also examines Hispanic literary traditions in the United States.

He has published more than 300 essays and articles in Academic and Literary Journals and has participated in conferences and delivered papers in Spain, France, Italy, Germany, and England.

Fuentes is the author of California Hispano-Mexicana. Una nueva narrativa histórico-cultural and César Chávez y la Unión (Una historia victoriosa de los de abajo), and has collaborated extensively with scholars of Latin American, Mexican, and Chicano literature. From 1995 to 2010, he co-edited with Luis Leal the journal Ventana Abierta: Revista Latina de Literatura, Arte y Cultura, published by the Center for Chicano Studies at UCSB.

== Bibliography ==
- Fuentes, Víctor (1980). La marcha al pueblo en las letras españolas, 1917-1936. Nuestro mundo ; Serie Arte y cultura (1st ed.). Madrid: Ediciones de la Torre. ISBN 978-84-85866-02-1.
- Fuentes, Vic. El cantico material y espiritual de Cesar Vallejo. Barcelona : Victor Pozanco, Editor. ISBN 8474571243.
- Galdós, Benito Pérez; Fuentes, Víctor (1982). Galdós, demócrata y republicano: escritos y discursos 1907-1913 (in Spanish). Cabildo Insular de Gran Canaria. ISBN 978-84-600-2458-3.
- Fuentes, Víctor (1989). Benjamín Jarnes, bio-grafía y metaficción (in Spanish). Institución Fernando el Católico. ISBN 978-84-7820-035-1.
- Fuentes, Víctor (1989). Buñuel: cine y literatura (in Spanish). Salvat. ISBN 978-84-345-4955-5.
- Fuentes, Víctor (1993). Buñuel en México: iluminaciones sobre una pantalla pobre (in Spanish). Instituto de Estudios Turolenses, Excma. Diputación Provincial de Teruel. ISBN 978-84-86982-36-2.
- Fuentes, Víctor (2018). Antonio Machado en el siglo XXI: (nueva trilla de su poesía, pensamiento y persona) (in Spanish). Visor Libros.
- Fuentes, Víctor (2019). Galdós, 100 años después, y en el presente: (ensayos actualizadores) (in Spanish). Visor Libros. ISBN 978-84-9895-530-9.
- Fuentes, Víctor, ed. (2024). Florilegio de las letras en Español en los Estados Unidos: del siglo XVI a mediados del XX: en su contexto histórico-cultural (1st. ed.). Doral, FL: Stockcero. ISBN 978-1-949938-21-0.
