= M. Miriam Herrera =

American writer (born 1963)

M Miriam Herrera
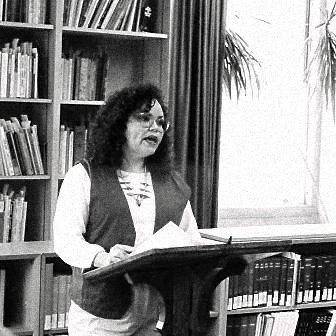
- M Miriam Herrera at Russell Sage College, Troy NY, April 2012
- Born: June 14, 1963 (age 63); Sutherland, Nebraska
- Education: University of Illinois, Chicago
- Writing career
- Language: English; Spanish
- Genre: Poetry
- Notable work: Kaddish for Columbus
- Literary movement: Converso, Chicano

M. Miriam Herrera (born June 14, 1963) is an American author and poet. She teaches at the University of Texas Rio Grande Valley and currently teaches Introduction to Mexican Studies as well as Composition and Rhetoric and Creative Writing. She is a Lecturer with the Department of Writing Language Studies, and a Mexican American Studies Program (MASC) Affiliate.

== Early life ==
Herrera was born to natives of the Rio Grande Valley of South Texas. She was born in Sutherland, Nebraska, where her parents had been working in the sugar-beet fields. She was raised in Aurora, Illinois, where her parents moved to escape a migratory life of farm work. Herrera began writing poetry as a grade school student when she met Gwendolyn Brooks, former Poet Laureate of Illinois, and heard her read her poetry at Herrera's elementary school.

== Education ==
Herrera attended the University of Illinois at Chicago Program For Writers and earned her Master of Arts degree in Creative Writing in 1981. She studied with John Frederic Nims, the editor of Poetry Magazine; Ralph J. Mills, editor of The Selected Letters of Theodore Roethke and The Notebooks of David Ignatow; and Paul Carroll, founder of the Poetry Center of Chicago and of Big Table Magazine. While attending the University of Illinois at Chicago, Herrera was involved in the Chicano literary community, which included Sandra Cisneros, Carlos Cumpian, Norma Alarcón, Ana Castillo and Ralph Cintron as her contemporaries.

== Teaching career ==
Herrera taught creative writing, poetry writing, Chicano/Latino literature, and expository writing at the University of Illinois at Chicago; the University of New Mexico–Los Alamos; South Bay College, Hawthorne, California; and Russell Sage College, Troy, New York. She is a member of the Community of Writers at Squaw Valley, California, and is the founder of the Writing Studio, Medusa Community of Poets & Writers, and the Audre Lorde Poetry Prize at Russell Sage College. Currently she is a member of the Society for Crypto-Judaic Studies and serves as the poetry editor for their journal, HaLapid.

Herrera descends from Crypto-Jews, also known as Conversos. These converts to Catholicism escaped the Spanish Inquisition for the New World where they intermarried with the indigenous peoples and old Christians who populated the American Southwest. Her poetry collection, Kaddish for Columbus explores the enigma of these divergent identities and landscapes the poet inhabits:

"Mythic borders appear in the poems as a metaphor for life that are found beyond physical space—the borders between peoples, ideas, religions, landscapes; between science and spirit, between self; how identities are transformed when one side collides with another; how the poet, a descendant of both Columbus and Native Americans, reconciles ambiguity."

== Publications ==
Herrera's poetry has been published in many literary journals, including Southwestern American Literature, Earth's Daughters, Albatross, Blue Mesa Review, and Nimrod International Journal of Prose and Poetry.

== Books ==
- Kaddish for Columbus: Finishing Line Press (2009)

== Poetry ==
- Southwestern American Literature (2009): "Ahuacatl," "Blessing the Animals," "La Malinche"
- Albatross: "Elegy for an Angelito" (2009)
- Earth's Daughters (2008): "Once I Heard My Father Cry"
- Rainmakers Prayers Anthology (2008): "Kiva at Chaco Canyon"
- New Millennium Writings (2006–2007): "In the Calyx"
- Squaw Valley Poetry Anthology (2005): "At the Edge of Town"
- Artlife: The Original Limited Edition Monthly (Vol. 25, No. 8, Issue No. 273) "Witch Wife"
- New Zoo Poetry Review (Vol. 4): "Father's Love Letter"
- Nimrod International Journal of Prose and Poetry (Vol. 41, No. 2): "Kaddish for Columbus"
- Blue Mesa Review (No. 3): "Kiva at Chaco Canyon"
- Ecos: A Latino Journal of People's Culture and Literature (Vol. 2, No. 2): "To Jenny," "First Snow," "Waterfall"; (Vol. 2, No. 1): "Visit Home," "Love Poem for Charles"
- Black Maria (Vol. 4, No. 2): "Driving in Fog," "Dream of Three Girls at Play"
