= Palmer Hall =

Palmer Hall may refer to:

- H. Palmer Hall, an American author known as Palmer Hall
- Palmer Hall (Colorado College), listed on the NRHP in El Paso County, Colorado
