= J.J. Hernandez =

American poet

J. J. Hernandez is an American poet and a Colorado native. Hernandez holds a B.A. and an M.F.A. in poetry from the MFA Program Creative Writing at California State University, Fresno. He lives in Fresno, California. Hernandez has served as the inaugural fellow in the Laureate Lab: Visual Words Studio under the 21st United States Poet Laureate (2015 to 2017), Juan Felipe Herrera. Hernandez has published poetry in Tinderbox, The Acentos Review, Queen Mob's Tea House, Crab Orchard Review and other journals and anthologies.
