= Vince Gotera =

American poet and writer (born 1952)

- The Man with the Blue Guitar blog, June 2009.
- Born: Vicente Ferrer Gotera; June 20, 1952 (age 74); San Francisco, California, U.S.
- Occupations: Poet, writer, critic, professor
- Writing career
- Genres: poetry, fiction, creative nonfiction, literary criticism

Vince Gotera (/ɡoʊˈtɛrə/; born June 20, 1952) is an American poet and writer, best known as Editor of the North American Review. In 1996, Nick Carbó called him a "leading Filipino-American poet of this generation"; later, in 2004, Carbó described him as "one of the leading Asian American poets ... willing to take a stance against American imperialism."

== Life ==
Born Vicente Ferrer Gotera on June 20, 1952, to Candida Fajardo Gotera and Martin Avila Gotera, immigrants from the Philippines. He was born and raised in San Francisco, but spent some time as a child in the Philippines.

In 1971, Gotera started college at Stanford University. Having a draft lottery number of 30, Gotera served in the US Army during the Vietnam War (1972–1975). After returning to college, he earned an A.A. in General Studies from City College of San Francisco (1977), a B.A. in English from Stanford (1979), and then an M.A. in English (American Literature) from San Francisco State University (1981). Gotera then moved to Indiana University, where he earned an M.F.A. in poetry (1989) and a joint (or double-major) PhD in English and in American Studies (1992).

Since 1995, Gotera has taught at the University of Northern Iowa, where he is a professor of English specializing in creative writing (both poetry and fiction) and multicultural American literature. He also taught at Humboldt State University from 1989 to 1995. Other institutions where he has taught include Indiana University, Grinnell College, and Wartburg College. He also frequently teaches creative writing at the annual Iowa Summer Writing Festival sponsored by the University of Iowa.

Gotera and Nick Carbó are the co-founders of FLIPS, a listserve for writers of Filipino ancestry and anyone interested in Filipino literature and arts. The cyber-community was founded in 1997.

In 2000, Gotera was appointed Editor of the North American Review (NAR); established in 1815, the NAR is the longest-lived literary magazine in the US. Previously, he was Associate Editor of Literary Magazine Review (1995–2001) and Poetry Editor of Asian America: Journal of Culture and the Arts (1991–1993).

== Works ==
Gotera is the author of three poetry collections, most recently Fighting Kite (Pecan Grove Press, 2007). In The Best American Poetry blog, Emma Trelles includes Fighting Kite among "a list of chapbooks well worth the read." Gotera's second poetry collection Ghost Wars was published by Final Thursday Press (2003); this chapbook won the Global Filipino Literary Award for Poetry in 2004. About Ghost Wars critic Matthew Hundley wrote, "For those of us who have not experienced war – nor have direct contact with family members who have – these poems give us a taste of the pain and pleasure that war brings about. Dragonfly (Pecan Grove Press, 1994) was Gotera's first poetry collection; critic Will Hochman called Dragonfly "a collection of poems that feels like a scalpel – in the book's cultural wingspan, Vince Gotera flies through Vietnam, rock and roll, terrorism and art with a voice that is iconoclastic, steely and real."

Gotera's work has appeared in such literary magazines as Ploughshares, Caliban, Amerasia, The Kenyon Review, The Asian Pacific American Journal, Zone 3, and others, as well as in anthologies like Contemporary Fiction by Filipinos in America, Tilting the Continent: Southeast Asian American Writing, and From Totems to Hip-Hop: A Multicultural Anthology of Poetry Across the Americas, 1900–2002.

Gotera has also published a book of literary criticism titled Radical Visions: Poetry by Vietnam Veterans (University of Georgia Press, 1994.)

In 2008, Gotera started a blog, The Man with the Blue Guitar. This blog discusses his poetry, poetics, fiction, and other literary ventures. Gotera's blog also features reprints from his 2004 book-review column in the Cedar Falls Times, titled "Of Books and Such." The title of this column is a tribute to his father Martin Gotera, who wrote a column titled "Of This and Such" in the San Francisco-based Philippine News during the '60s and '70s.

Gotera is also an emerging filmmaker. His 2009 video titled "'Maybe Dats Your Pwoblem Too' by Jim Hall" is a spoken-word performance of James W. Hall's humorous poem with Spiderman as speaker. About this film Jim Hall wrote, "I'm honored he did such a great job with this poem. He actually performs it better than I do." "Deconstructing Cummings" is Gotera's animation of e. e. cummings's poem "l(a" – a video aimed at helping students "decode" and understand a notoriously difficult poem.

== Awards ==
Gotera has won international, national, and local awards for his writing and teaching. In 2004, Gotera won the Global Filipino Literary Award in Poetry, an international award sponsored by the journal Our Own Voice. His national awards include a Creative Writing Fellowship in Poetry from the National Endowment for the Arts (1993), The Felix Pollak Prize in Poetry from The Madison Review (1988), the Mary Roberts Rinehart Award in poetry (1988), and an Academy of American Poets Prize (1988). He has been nominated for the Pushcart Prize three times. At the University of Northern Iowa, Gotera won a Faculty Excellence Award from the College of Humanities and Fine Arts (2006).

== Bibliography ==
=== Books ===
- Dragonfly. Pecan Grove Press. 1994. ISBN 978-1-877603-25-9. (Poetry).
- Radical Visions: Poetry by Vietnam Veterans. University of Georgia Press. 1994. ISBN 978-0-8203-1510-2. (Literary Criticism).
- Ghost Wars. Final Thursday Press. 2003. ISBN 978-0-9742764-0-3. (Poetry).
- Fighting Kite. Pecan Grove Press. 2007. ISBN 978-1-931247-23-8. (Poetry).

=== Poetry ===
Selected poems, online

- "Ghost Dance." The Daily Palette (May 2007).
- "Iowa Winter Haiku," "Looking for Double Victory," "Chorus of Glories." Mirror Northwest (Contemporary Poetry section).
- "50 Years Later, A Woman Recalls," "Honor, 1946," "The Vietnam Vet Plays Gyruss," "Sniper, 2002," "Refusal to Write an Elegy," "Love in the Time of Al Qaeda." Our Own Voice (January 2005).
- "Little Wing," "Tunnel Rat," "Veterans Day 1987." Big City Lit (June 2001).

=== Fiction ===
Selected stories, in print

- "Manny's Climb." Tilting the Continent: Southeast Asian American Literature, ed. Shirley Geok-lin Lim and Cheng-Lok Chua, New Rivers Press, 2000. Reprinted in Growing Up Filipino: Stories for Young Adults, ed. Cecilia Manguerra Brainard. PALH, 2003.
- "Returning Fire." Into the Fire: Asian American Prose, ed. Sylvia Watanabe and Carol Bruchac, Greenfield Review Press, 1996. Reprinted in Contemporary Fiction by Filipinos in America, ed. Cecilia Manguerra Brainard. Anvil Publishing, 1998.

=== Creative Nonfiction ===
Selected essays, online

- "Moments in the Wilderness: Becoming a Filipino American Writer.", MELUS, 29.1, Filipino American Literature, (Spring 2004).
- "Mentor and Friend: Yusef Komunyakaa as Teacher.", Callaloo 28.3 (2005).

=== Anthologies ===
Selected anthologized pieces, online

- Sam Hamill; Sally Anderson; et al., eds. (2003). "Guard Duty". Poets against the War. Thunder's Mouth Press. ISBN 978-1-56025-539-0.
- Ishmael Reed, ed. (2003). "Dance of the Letters". From Totems to Hip-Hop: A Multicultural Anthology of Poetry Across the Americas, 1900–2002. Thunder's Mouth Press. p. 129. ISBN 978-1-56025-500-0.

=== Films ===
Selected videos, online

- "'Maybe Dats Your Pwoblem Too' by Jim Hall" (2009) on YouTube.
- "Deconstructing Cummings ... l(a" (2009) on YouTube

=== Interviews ===
Selected interviews, online

- Interview by Rustin Larson. Irving Toast, Poetry Ghost (KRUU). Audio, online (August 2009).
- Interview by Paula Berinstein, "About Literary Magazines (and Submitting Work to Them)." The Writing Show: Information and Inspiration for Writers. Audio, online (August 2008).
