= President's Peace Commission =

Peace events at St. Mary's University, Texas

The President's Peace Commission is a body composed of invited faculty, staff and students of St. Mary's University in San Antonio, Texas. Each year the Commission chooses a significant theme bearing on the related subjects of peace and justice. Always relevant to the United States, this theme can involve international considerations. In the fall, two days are designated for discussions of the theme by invited speakers and panelists. In the spring, a program is produced which features a concert and the bestowal of the Art of Peace award upon a chosen individual.

== History of the President's Peace Commission ==
In 1984 the Faculty Senate of St. Mary's University proposed establishment of a commission by the university president to further peace education. Initially this need focused on East-West tensions, especially the threat of nuclear war. Two years later the first program was held. More than 250 videos documenting the President's Peace Commission sessions can be viewed at the Louis J. Blume Library on the St. Mary's campus. Thousands attend the Commission events each year.

== Mission Statement of the President's Peace Commission ==
The President's Peace Commission fosters an ethical commitment to participate in the establishment of world peace and social justice. The Commission encourages respect for human rights and dignity of all people. The Commission annually hosts symposia that offer opportunities for students, faculty, and staff to grow in their active pursuit of peace and justice. Through the symposia and other activities, the Commission seeks to build within the St. Mary's University community a greater awareness of the Roman Catholic and Marianist perspectives on peace and justice. The President's Peace Commission reflects the University community through student, staff, and faculty representatives appointed by the University President.

== Art of Peace Award ==
The Art of Peace award has been granted annually since 1999. Normally the university president bestows the award in person at the spring program. The chosen artist must possess a reputation for quality work and be known as a person who attempts to further the cause of peace. Since it is desirable that the artist's work be integrated into the program, it must be performable. The committee assigned to designate the Art of Peace awardee attempts to name an individual associated with St. Mary's University but is not limited to this association.

=== Awardees ===
- 1999: Carmen Tafolla, Ms. Paulette Jiles, and Ms. Angela De Hoyos
- 2000: John Phillip Santos
- 2001: Brother Cletus Behlmann
- 2002: John Branch
- 2003: Sister Martha Ann Kirk, CCVI, Ph.D.
- 2004: Naomi Shihab Nye
- 2005: Paul Bonin-Rodriguez
- 2006: Barbara Paleczny, SSND, Ph.D.
- 2007: Trinidad Sanchez, Jr. (posthumous)
- 2008: H. Palmer Hall

In addition, a special award was given to Dr. Amy Freeman Lee at the 2001 spring program.
