= Pecan Grove Press =

Pecan Grove Press publishes primarily poetry books and chapbooks. Though sponsored by the Department of English and The Academic Library of St. Mary's University in San Antonio, Texas, the press is self-supporting. Founded in 1988 by St. Mary's faculty member, Karen Navarte, Pecan Grove Press has served poets for more than 20 years. It receives approximately 300 manuscripts for consideration yearly and has produced more than 110 books. Although the press's scope includes poets from across the state of Texas and as far away as Canada, it remains true to its roots by continuing to publish at least one San Antonio poet each year.

Since 1990 H. Palmer Hall, the library director at St. Mary's University, has served as the press's director. In his capacity, Dr. Hall has expanded the mission of Pecan Grove Press by publishing writers from all over the United States, Canada and Mexico while continuing to publish St. Mary's University student poets and writers from the San Antonio area. Pecan Grove Press celebrated its 20th anniversary in 2008 by publishing its 100th book of poetry.

== Notable Poets ==
Among the notable poets published by Pecan Grove Press are three state Poets Laureate: Larry D. Thomas, Poet Laureate of Texas from 2007 to 2009; Patricia Fargnoli, Poet Laureate of New Hampshire from 2006 to 2009; and James Hoggard, Poet Laureate of Texas from 1998 - 2000. Other notable poets include Vince Gotera, editor of North American Review; Marian Haddad; Edward Byrne, well known for his "One Poet's Notes" blog; Olga Samples Davis; Wendy Barker, winner of two Violet Crown awards from the Texas League of Writers; Gwyn McVay; award-winning poet, essayist and dramatist David Brendan Hopes; Cyra S. Dumitru; Colin Morton, award-winning Canadian poet; Bonnie Lyons; and Joel Peckham.
