= Rolando Hinojosa-Smith =

American writer and academic (1929–2022)

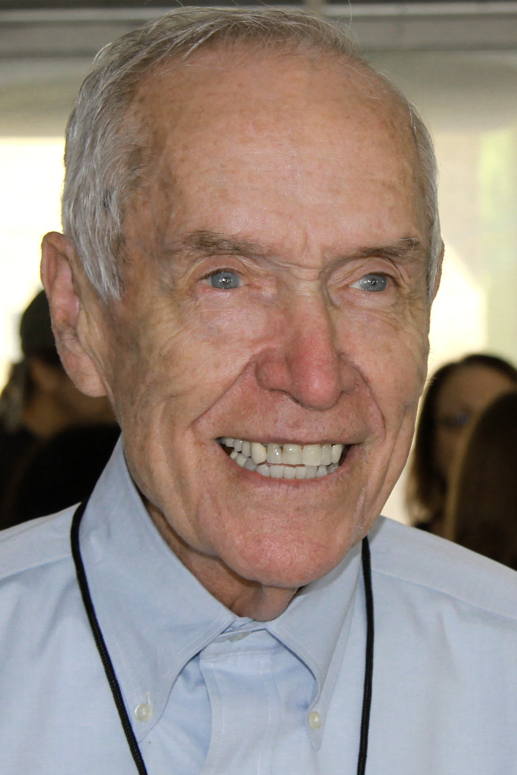
- Hinojosa-Smith at the 2014 Texas Book Festival
- Born: Romeo Daniel Hinojosa; January 21, 1929; Mercedes, Texas, U.S.
- Died: April 19, 2022 (aged 93); Cedar Park, Texas, U.S.
- Education: University of Texas at Austin; New Mexico Highlands University; University of Illinois Urbana-Champaign (PhD)
- Occupations: Novelist; poet; professor
- Writing career
- Notable work: Klail City Death Trip Series (15 vols.)
- Notable awards: Premio Casa de las Américas; Quinto Sol

Romeo Rolando Hinojosa-Smith (January 21, 1929 – April 19, 2022) was an American novelist, essayist, poet and the Ellen Clayton Garwood professor in the English Department at the University of Texas at Austin. He was noted for authoring the Klail City Death Trip series of 15 novels written over several decades.

== Early life and education ==
Hinojosa was born Romeo Daniel Hinojosa in Mercedes, Texas, on January 21, 1929. His father, Manuel Guzman Hinojosa, was a Hispanic American sheriff and a veteran of the Mexican Revolution; his mother, Carrie Effie Smith, was an Anglo-American housewife and teacher. The author grew up with Spanish as his native language, however he became proficient through Mexican immigrants, who came in exile to Mercedes after the revolution, that created "las escuelitas", or little schools, as means of teaching people how to formally read and write in Spanish. Hinojosa also acknowledges La Prensa (San Antonio), a Spanish newspaper based in San Antonio, Texas, that would release content semi-weekly, as one of the reasons he became proficient in the language. Hinojosa would learn English in junior high.

At the age of 17, Hinojosa joined the United States Army where he was sent to the Office of Information and Education at Fort Eustis, Virginia. After completion of his training, he attended the University of Texas at Austin, where he was a member of the Tejas Club, before returning to the army to serve in the Korean War, where he would find inspiration for many of his literature works on the war such as Korean Love Songs (1978), Rites and Witnesses (1989), and The Useless Servants (1993).

Rolando Smith graduated from University of Texas at Austin in 1953. After working as a high school teacher, chemical-plant laborer, and civil servant during the ensuing decade, he undertook postgraduate studies at New Mexico Highlands University, obtaining a master's degree from that institution in 1962 before being awarded a Doctor of Philosophy from the University of Illinois Urbana-Champaign seven years later. Like his grandmother, mother and three of his four siblings, he became a teacher; he held several academic posts and was also active in administration and consulting work.

=== Influences ===
Hinojosa would regularly read Anthony Powell's A Dance to the Music of Time in his early seventies, in addition to Marcel Proust, Alexander Pushkin, Heinrich Böll, and Miguel Ángel Asturias. Of these, the author has claimed that Böll was one of his favorite authors, with his favorite piece from Böll being Billiards at Half-Past Nine, a story that narrates with recounts by characters and flashbacks.

Although Hinojosa was already writing by the time he read Somerset Maugham, the Mexican-American author claims that the English writer taught him how to read from the perspective of a writer. Hinojosa also drew inspiration from Luis Leal and linguist Marcos Morínigo. After having multiple conversations with the duo, the author decided to focus on the Mexican-American experience, specifically from the Texas border area. Hinojosa states that one of his first audiences was Tomás Rivera, another prominent Chicano author who had already published his well known work, ...y no se lo tragó la tierra (1971). After Hinojosa sent a chapter of what would become Por esas cosas que pasa (1972) to Rivera, Rivera forwarded it to Quinto Sol Publications. The publishing company offered Hinojosa a contract thereafter.

Hinojosa-Smith has also been inspired by William Faulkner, who is prominently known for his novels and short stories that take place in the fictional Yoknapatawpha County. Rolando Hinojosa's Klail City Death Trap Series mirrors this with his own fictional county that takes place in the American-Texas border instead of Faulker's Mississippi area.

== Career ==
Hinojosa first taught at Trinity University, and later moved to larger institutions in Texas A&I University and the University of Minnesota. He then joined the University of Texas at Austin in 1981, teaching there as the Ellen Clayton Garwood professor of creative writing until he retired in 2016. He devoted most of his career as a writer to his Klail City Death Trip Series, which comprises 15 volumes, from Estampas del Valle y otras obras (1973) to We Happy Few (2006). He completely populated a fictional county in the lower Rio Grande Valley of Texas through this generational narrative. The series uses multiple styles, such as poems, journal entries, epistles, and sketches to talk about multiple subjects such as the Mexican-American experience in Texas, including daily life, corruption, politics, marriage, academia, and war. Collectively however, the series uses realism, satire, humor and irony, with most of his books consisting of short stories or narratives from the people of the Valley. These stories can focus on the same issue, such as the titular character's divorce in Becky and Her Friends (1980), where the people of her community discuss her impending divorce and discusses statuses such as economic, gender, and social. They can also be a loose connection of short stories around Klail City, such as Hinojosa's first book Estampas de Valle y otras obras. Although he preferred to write in Spanish, Hinojosa also translated his own books and wrote others in English. He ultimately authored approximately 20 fiction and non-fiction books throughout his career.

Hinojosa uses his own life experiences growing up on the frontier border to write his books. For example, the Mexican-American author has stated that, although the Mexican Revolution officially ended in 1920, there were still skirmishes from both sides of the forces until 1934 with the election of President Lázaro Cárdenas del Río. Inspired by these conflicts as well as the stories his father would tell him, The Mexican Revolution was a prominent topic in his early of books of KCDTS, notably Estampas del Valle (1973) and Klail City y sus alrededores (1976). In Estampas del Valle (1973), specifically under the chapter "Otra Vez La Muerte", Hinojosa writes about a man's experience in the war in the style of journal entries that the character wrote in while stationed in Papantla, Veracruz in the spring of 1920.

Hinojosa has derived some of his literature from his time serving in Korea. The author uses Korean Love Songs (1978) as means of expressing his frustrations with his own country. Under the chapter "The Eighth Army at Chongchon", Rafe (the character writing the poems about the war), makes a reference to the General Walton H. Walker's comment on the underestimation of Chinese fighters in the Korean War, who proclaims that the many Chinese groups that live in Korea are akin to Mexicans living in Texas, implying that the general views Mexican-Americans as Mexican and thus not as actual Americans. Rafe writes "and many of us there/ were reminded who we were/ thousands of miles from home." Thus, Rafe, and therefore Hinojosa, seems to be irritated that they risk death for a country that sees them as internationals regardless.

New and changing experiences of the author's life is reflected in his novels. The rise of cartel violence at the border influenced Hinojosa to write two police work novels in Partners in Crime (1985) and Ask a Policeman (1998), which discuss betrayal, corruption, and violence at the border.

Hinojosa was the first Chicano author to receive the prestigious Premio Casa de las Américas award for Klail City y sus alrededores (Klail City), part of the series. He also received the third and final Premio Quinto Sol Annual Prize (1972), for his work Estampas del Valle y otras obras. He was later conferred the Ivan Sandrof Lifetime Achievement Award by the National Book Critics Circle Award in 2014. In presenting him with the award, the organization described him as "the dean of Chicano authors" and "a mentor and inspiration to several generations of writers".

=== Bilingualism in KCDTS ===
Rolando Hinojosa's series is written in both Spanish and English. However, the author originally wrote the series in Spanish as it is his native language, as he first wrote Estampas del Valle in 1973 and the English rendition was not published until 1983, almost a decade later. Much has been noted about the differences between the English and Spanish versions of the series, such as the rearrangements in chapters, added content to the English version with a picture included, and changes in dialogue to accommodate between the two cultures such as proverbs and slang that are meant to fit in better with their respective cultures. The 2014 reprint of Estampas del Valle/ The Valley includes both the Spanish and English version, where such chapter rearrangements are more obvious. Observations from this book is that after the chapter "Bruno Cano: Lock, Stock, and BBL", the section switches from focusing on Jehu Malacara to Rafe Buenrostro. In the Spanish original version, there are a couple of more stories such as "Don Javier" and "Emilio Taves", with the section on Rafe Buenrostro not coming until the very last section of the book.

Another example is seen in the sequel to the books, Klail City y sus alrededores (1976) in Spanish and Klail City (1987) in English. In Klail City y sus alrededores, Jehu Malacara travels with a Protestant preacher, Iman, spreading their word and selling the bible around the community. Iman is less literate in the Spanish language, with Hinojosa displaying it with Iman's inability to conjugate verbs in Spanish correctly, as well as his troubles with gender agreement. This illiteracy does not translate well in English, with Hinojosa instead compromising by letting Iman speak in rather unusual alliterations as well as a general odd manner of speaking to keep the same message that Iman speaks in an unusual way.

Hinojosa himself has noted the differences between the English and Spanish versions of his series, noting that he sees his translations as more so "renditions", giving him the freedom to edit his content to better suit the community that he is aiming between English-Spanish speakers and Spanish-English speakers. He also states that he rarely translates his English books into Spanish, as he has noted that the Mexican-American community is more proficient in English than in Spanish.

== Personal life ==
Hinojosa's first marriage was to Lilia Saenz, with whom he had one child (Bob Huddleston). They eventually divorced. He subsequently married Patricia Sorensen. Together, they had two children: Clarissa and Karen. They remained married until her death in 1999.

Hinojosa died on April 19, 2022, at an assisted living facility in Cedar Park, Texas. He was 93, and suffered from dementia prior to his death.

== Awards and honors ==
- Alumni Achievement Award, given by the Illinois Alumni Association (1998)
- Ivan Sandrof Lifetime Achievement Award, given by the National Book Critics Circle Award

== Works ==
- Ask a Policeman. Houston: Arte Público. 1998. ISBN 9781558852266
- Los amigos de Becky. Houston, Texas: Arte Público, 1991.
- Becky and her Friends. Houston, Texas: Arte Público, 1990. ISBN 9781558850064
- Claros varones de Belken. Tempe, Ariz.: Bilingual, 1986. ISBN 9780916950644
- El condado de Belken: Klail City. Tempe: Bilingual, 1994. ISBN 9780927534338
- "Crossing the Line: The Construction of a Poem." Milwaukee, WI: Spanish Speaking Outreach Institute-U. of Wisconsin, 1981.
- Dear Rafe. Houston, Texas: Arte Público, 1985. ISBN 9780934770385
- Dear Rafe/Mi querido Rafa. Houston: Arte Público Press, 2005. ISBN 9781611921106
- Estampas del Valle. Tempe: Bilingual, 1994. ISBN 9780927534246
- Estampas del Valle y otras obras. Berkeley: Quinto Sol, 1973. ISBN 9780884120605
- Estampas del Valle y otras obras. Berkeley: Justa, 1977.
- Generaciones, notas y brechas. San Francisco: Casa Editorial, 1978.
- Generaciones y semblanzas. 1977. Berkeley: Justa, 1979. ISBN 9780915808137
- Klail City. Houston, Texas: Arte Público, 1987. ISBN 9780934770545
- Klail City und Umgebung. Frankfurt am Main: Suhrkamp, 1981. ISBN 9783518372098
- Klail City y sus alrededores. La Habana: Casa de las Américas, 1976.
- Korean Love Songs. Berkeley, Calif.: Justa, 1978. ISBN 9780915808311
  - Korea Liebes Lieder/Korean Love Songs. O.B.E.M.A., Nr. 6, Osnabrück, Germany, 1991 ISBN 9783925713101
- Mi querido Rafa. Houston, Texas: Arte Público, 1981. ISBN 9780934770101
- Partners in Crime. Houston, Texas: Arte Público, 1985. ISBN 9780934770378
- Rites and Witnesses. Houston, Texas: Arte Público, 1982. ISBN 9780934770194
- This Migrant Earth. Houston, Texas: Arte Público, 1987. ISBN 9780934770552
- The Useless Servants. Houston: Arte Público, 1993. ISBN 9781558850682
- The Valley. Ypsilanti, MI: Bilingual, 1983. ISBN 9780916950385 (Hinojosa's own translation of Estampas del Valle)
- We Happy Few. Houston: Arte Público Press, 2006. ISBN 9781558853584

Works and editions https://faculty.ucmerced.edu/mmartin-rodriguez/index_files/vhHinojosaRolando.htm
