= Sutherland, Nebraska =

- Village
- Sutherland, seen from the east along U.S. Highway 30

- Location of Sutherland, Nebraska
- Coordinates: 41°09′34″N 101°07′54″W
- Country: United States
- State: Nebraska
- County: Lincoln

Area
  - Total: 1.30 sq mi (3.37 km^{2})
  - Land: 1.30 sq mi (3.37 km^{2})
  - Water: 0 sq mi (0.00 km^{2})
- Elevation: 2,956 ft (901 m)

Population (2020)
  - Total: 1,313
  - Density: 1,008.9/sq mi (389.55/km^{2})
- Time zone: UTC-6 (Central (CST))
  - Summer (DST): UTC-5 (CDT)
- ZIP code: 69165
- Area code: 308
- FIPS code: 31-47920
- GNIS feature ID: 2399937
- Website: villageofsutherland.com

Sutherland is a village in Lincoln County, Nebraska, United States. It is part of the North Platte, Nebraska Micropolitan Statistical Area. As of the 2020 census, Sutherland had a population of 1,313.

== History ==
Sutherland was platted in 1891 after the Union Pacific Railroad had been built through the settlement.

== Geography ==
According to the United States Census Bureau, the village has a total area of 1.04 square miles (2.69 km^{2}), all land.

== Demographics ==
Historical population
| Census | Pop. | Note | %± |
|---|---|---|---|
| 1910 | 447 | | — |
| 1920 | 651 | | 45.6% |
| 1930 | 753 | | 15.7% |
| 1940 | 862 | | 14.5% |
| 1950 | 856 | | −0.7% |
| 1960 | 867 | | 1.3% |
| 1970 | 840 | | −3.1% |
| 1980 | 1,238 | | 47.4% |
| 1990 | 1,032 | | −16.6% |
| 2000 | 1,129 | | 9.4% |
| 2010 | 1,286 | | 13.9% |
| 2020 | 1,313 | | 2.1% |
U.S. Decennial Census

=== 2010 census ===
As of the census of 2010, there were 1,286 people, 473 households, and 339 families living in the village. The population density was 1,236.5 inhabitants per square mile (477.4/km^{2}). There were 534 housing units at an average density of 513.5 per square mile (198.3/km^{2}). The racial makeup of the village was 97.0% White, 0.7% Native American, 0.2% Asian, 0.1% Pacific Islander, 1.6% from other races, and 0.5% from two or more races. Hispanic or Latino of any race were 5.0% of the population.

There were 473 households, of which 36.4% had children under the age of 18 living with them, 61.3% were married couples living together, 5.7% had a female householder with no husband present, 4.7% had a male householder with no wife present, and 28.3% were non-families. 24.9% of all households were made up of individuals, and 10.7% had someone living alone who was 65 years of age or older. The average household size was 2.60 and the average family size was 3.11.

The median age in the village was 39.9 years. 27.4% of residents were under the age of 18; 5.9% were between the ages of 18 and 24; 23.4% were from 25 to 44; 23.6% were from 45 to 64; and 19.7% were 65 years of age or older. The gender makeup of the village was 49.5% male and 50.5% female.

=== 2000 census ===
As of the census of 2000, there were 1,129 people, 442 households, and 307 families living in the village. The population density was 1,202.8 inhabitants per square mile (464.4/km^{2}). There were 465 housing units at an average density of 495.4 per square mile (191.3/km^{2}). The racial makeup of the village was 95.84% White, 0.09% African American, 0.35% Native American, 3.28% from other races, and 0.44% from two or more races. Hispanic or Latino of any race were 5.05% of the population.

There were 442 households, out of which 31.7% had children under the age of 18 living with them, 59.5% were married couples living together, 5.7% had a female householder with no husband present, and 30.5% were non-families. 27.8% of all households were made up of individuals, and 14.5% had someone living alone who was 65 years of age or older. The average household size was 2.45 and the average family size was 3.02.

In the village, the population was spread out, with 25.3% under the age of 18, 6.6% from 18 to 24, 25.2% from 25 to 44, 24.1% from 45 to 64, and 18.9% who were 65 years of age or older. The median age was 40 years. For every 100 females, there were 96.3 males. For every 100 females age 18 and over, there were 96.5 males.

The median age in the village was 39.9 years. 27.4% of residents were under the age of 18; 5.9% were between the ages of 18 and 24; 23.4% were from 25 to 44; 23.6% were from 45 to 64; and 19.7% were 65 years of age or older. The gender makeup of the village was 49.5% male and 50.5% female.

As of 2000 the median income for a household in the village was $39,583, and the median income for a family was $47,132. Males had a median income of $34,107 versus $20,729 for females. The per capita income for the village was $17,848. About 6.9% of families and 10.0% of the population were below the poverty line, including 15.9% of those under age 18 and 8.1% of those age 65 or over.

== Notable people ==
- M. Miriam Herrera, author and poet
- Cliff Mapes, baseball player
