= Abelardo Delgado =

American writer

Abelardo Barrientos "Lalo" Delgado (November 27, 1931 – July 23, 2004) was a Mexican-born American writer, community organizer, and poet. His work was important in establishing the Chicano poetry movement.

He was a major contributor to the Chicano Movement of the 1960s and 1970s. A professor in Metropolitan State University of Denver's Chicano/a Studies Department for 17 years, he was honored by the city of Denver posthumously in 2005 with the Dr. Martin Luther King Jr. Lifetime Achievement Award. In 2004, he was posthumously named Denver's first Poet Laureate. Metropolitan State University hosts the annual Lalo Delgado Poetry Festival; which celebrates Delgado as a social justice poet and "the grandfather of Chicano and Chicana poetry in this country."

Delgado was awarded the Tonatiuh-Quinto Sol Award for literature in 1977.

== Personal life ==
Born in Boquilla de Conchos, Chihuahua, Mexico, Delgado moved to El Paso, Texas in 1943. He grew up in a tenement occupied by 23 families sharing three bathrooms, learning English from a boys club after school. Delgado organized his first protest while in school, refusing to sing the National Anthem and eventually convincing his classmates to sing in Spanish instead.

Delgado graduated from high school in 1950, and he was vice president of the honor society. He spent time after high school working with youths at a community center in El Paso. In 1962, he earned a bachelor's degree in Spanish from the University of Texas at El Paso, which was notable for the time due to discrimination against Chicanos and Spanish-speakers.

Delgado was 21 years old when he met Lola Estrada. They married in 1953, moved to Colorado, and had eight children.
