= Trinidad Sanchez Jr. =

American poet

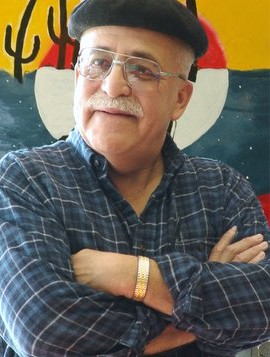
- Born: 15 June 1943; Pontiac, Michigan
- Died: 30 July 2006 (aged 63); San Antonio, Texas
- Occupation: Poet
- Spouse: Regina Chávez y Sánchez
- Writing career
- Genre: Poetry
- Notable work: Why Am I So Brown?

Trinidad Sanchez Jr. (15 June 1943 – 30 July 2006) was a poet and activist who wrote about culture and social issues. He received several awards during his lifetime and was given the President's Peace Commission Art of Peace award posthumously in 2007.

== Life ==
Trinidad Sanchez Jr. was born in Pontiac, Michigan, on June 15, 1943, the ninth of ten children born to Sofia Sánchez and Trinidad V. Sánchez Sr., also a poet.

Sanchez entered the Society of Jesus as a Jesuit brother in Detroit, Michigan, where he worked with young offenders and prison inmates. Remaining in the order for 27 years, Sanchez left the brotherhood but continued to work in prison ministry for an additional five years. In 1992, he moved to San Antonio, Texas to live with longtime friend Regina Chávez, whom he married on Nov. 26, 1993. From the late nineties until 2003, the couple lived in Denver, Colorado where they opened Cafe Taza, a coffee shop showcasing spoken-word performances. In 2003, the couple returned to San Antonio, where the poet spent his final years.

Working with young fathers in outreach programs, including Family Star's Montessori and Early Headstart programs, Sanchez used poetry as an exercise for expression in emotionally constrained young men.

In education, Sanchez was known as a "poet in the schools."

Through the years, Trinidad came to our campus [St. Mary's University] and generously shared his bilingual poetry during classroom readings and outdoor events. His encouragement, his wisdom, and his incredible poems fired up his audiences to venture forth as poets. He reminded listeners to trust their own voices, to be true to the words, and to remember that sometimes we need to laugh at ourselves.

In other activities, he participated in the Artist in Education Program for the San Antonio School District, part of the ArtsReach Program of the San Antonio Department of Art and Culture. He also toured with the Texas Literary Touring Program of the Austin Writers' League. He performed and lectured at various colleges, including Wayne State University, University of Wisconsin, Madison, Cal Poly Tech and Bowling Green University. He was also featured at the Austin International Poetry Festival, Houston Poetry Festival, Beyond Baroque Literary Center, the First Nezahualcoyotl Poetry Festival at the Mexican Fine Arts Center, the Detroit Institute of ArtsLine Series (Detroit, Michigan), and many other venues in 1990s and until his death in the first decade of the 21st century.

Sanchez is remembered for his passion for influencing young, aspiring Latino writers. A poetry contest in his name is sponsored by the San Antonio literary magazine, Voices de la Luna.

The Annual Trinidad Sanchez Jr. Memorial Poetry Festival is held for the poet in Detroit, Michigan.

== Works ==
Trinidad Sanchez Jr. was active in poetry readings. In addition, he published five books:

Why Am I So Brown? Chicago: MARCH/Abrazo Press, 1991
Compartiendo de la Nada. San Antonio: M & A Editions, 1994
Poems by Father and Son. San Antonio: Pecan Grove Press, 1996
Authentic Chicano Food is HOT! San Antonio: Adela & Abigail Productions, 1996
Jalapeño Blues. Mountainview: Floricanto Press, 2006

Sanchez's book,Why Am I So Brown?, is now in its sixth reprint.

Trinidad Sanchez, Junior's archives have been installed at Michigan State University as a part of the Cesar Chavez Collection.

== Awards ==
In 2007, the Art of Peace award was given posthumously by the President's Peace Commission to Trinidad Sanchez Jr. for working for peace and justice in his lifetime.

For his activism on behalf of prison inmates and his involvement in social issues, Sanchez received the Rev. Dr. Martin Luther King Jr. "Keep the Dream Alive Award."

In 1995, Trinidad won the Albuquerque Poetry Slam Competition and progressed to the National Poetry Slam the same year. His anti-gun, anti-crime poem, "Let Us Stop the Madness," was selected as one of the winning poems of the People's Choice Competition.
