= ...y no se lo tragó la tierra =

1971 novel by Tomás Rivera

...y no se lo tragó la tierra is a 1971 Tomás Rivera novel, most recently translated to English as ...And the Earth Did Not Devour Him. It is made up of fourteen short stories and thirteen vignettes. The novel presents stories that center around a community of South Texan Mexican American migrant farm workers during the late 1940s and early 1950s. The novel begins with the short story "A Lost Year", in which an unnamed male protagonist cannot seem to remember what occurred during the previous year. The stories and vignettes that follow are fragmented, lack chronology and lack consistency in characters. The last short story, "Under the House", ties all of these stories together by presenting them as the memories of the male protagonist, who seems to become empowered by the act of remembering. The novel won the Premio Quinto Sol prize for literature in 1970 and has since been adapted into a movie.

== Background ==
=== Background and publication ===
Rivera said he had trouble getting his works published at first, and said some of his manuscripts were probably rejected because he was Chicano. Rivera sent manuscripts everywhere and he said he received "thousands" of rejections before winning the Quinto Sol award and publishing his novel the subsequent year.

=== Editions ===
Rivera, Tomás (1971) ...y no se lo tragó la tierra/...And the Earth Did Not Part. Trans by Herminio Rios, Berkeley: Quinto Sol.

Rivera, Tomás (1977) ...y no se lo tragó la tierra/...And the Earth Did Not Part. Trans by Herminio Rios, Berkeley: Justa Publications.

Rivera, Tomás (1987) ...y no se lo tragó la tierra/ ...And the Earth Did Not Devour Him (English and Spanish edition). Translated by Evangelina Vigil-Piñón. Houston: Arte Publico Press.

Rivera, Tomás (1992) ...y no se lo tragó la tierra/ ...And the Earth Did Not Devour Him (English and Spanish edition). Translated by Evangelina Vigil-Piñón. Houston: Arte Publico Press.

Rivera, Tomás (2012) ...y no se lo tragó la tierra. Edition and Introduction by Julio Ramos and Gustavo Buenrostro, Buenos Aires: Ediciones Corregidor.

== Main themes ==
=== Social change ===
Many of the short stories in Rivera's novel reveal harrowing conditions that Mexican American migrant workers faced, and thus could be seen as a work that calls for social change to provide better working conditions for Mexican American migrant workers. In the short story "The Children Couldn't Wait", for example, a little migrant worker boy is shot to death by the farm boss for taking what the boss thought was too many breaks to drink water. Additionally, in "The Little Burnt Victims", two small children of migrant workers are burned to death in an accidental fire when they are left alone in their house. The parents were discouraged from bringing their children to the fields with them and thus had been forced to leave them at home alone. In this way, problems with working conditions for migrant workers are made clear in many of the stories. Furthermore, in "It's That It Hurts", the difficulty of getting a quality education for migrant farm worker children is stressed. In the story, a boy gets in trouble for hitting another student back, and knows that he will be expelled. The other boys at school call him "Mex" and make fun of him, and the principal justifies expelling him by saying, "...they could [sic] care less if I expel him...they need him in the fields". The racism the boy faces at school—both from children and adults—therefore hinders his ability to get a quality education. The stories thus expose dire conditions for Mexican American migrant workers and may be seen as a work that calls for structural changes to occur.

=== Disillusionment with Mexican American folk Catholicism ===
In many of the novel's short stories, the young male protagonist becomes disillusioned with aspects of Folk Catholicism. In "A Silvery Night", for instance, the boy decides that he will call the devil late at night, but the devil never shows up, even after the boy curses him. He therefore realizes that there is no devil. Similarly, in the short story "...And the Earth Did Not Devour Him", the boy—angry that his close kin are suffering even though they are good people—curses God, but nothing happens to him as a consequence. In fact, the next day his father and brother are getting over his sickness and the weather is less harsh for working. The developments in these two short stories and in others, as well, point to an overall theme in the novel of a sense of disillusionment with religion. The protagonist seems to embrace rationalist, individualist thinking.

=== Community building ===
However, in a chapter in his book Dancing with the Devil, José E. Limón argues that the novel does not in fact celebrate the protagonist's rationalist individualist thinking, and in fact associates him with the devil. Limón makes the point that in order for the boy in the novel to embrace rationality, he must put down and deem backwards his Mexican American culture's folk Catholicism. The boy therefore may be portrayed as the "real" devil in the story. In fact, Limón points out that in "Silvery Night", the boy actually puts on a devil's mask, and that in the story "...And the Earth Did Not Devour Him", the mother says she is afraid that the devil's blood runs through the boy already. Limón therefore suggests that the novel argues for the importance of a communal identity rather than an individualist one. This argument is supported by the fact that the novel brings together a myriad of voices from the Mexican American migrant worker community through the male protagonist's remembering and retelling of the stories, and by the fact that in the last short story the boy states that, "I would like to see all of the people together. And then, if I had great big arms, I could embrace them all."

== Latin American edition ==
Julio Ramos and Gustavo Buenrostro edited the first Latin American edition of Tomás Rivera's novel ...y no se lo tragó la tierra (1971). Ramos and Buenrostro's edition of Tierra inaugurated a collection of Mexican Literature in Argentina. In their extensive introduction, Ramos and Buenrostro argue that Rivera's outstanding fictionalization of memory resists the tendency to aestheticize and heroize the figure of the farm worker; which was a common practice of social realism during the decades of 1930 and 1940. In their introduction, Ramos and Buenrostro coin the notion of "lenguas sin estado (languages without state)". They also establish a connection between Tomás Rivera, Juan Rulfo, Octavio Paz, and other literatures from the Borderlands. Additionally, the Latin American edition of Tierra includes numerous unpublished materials that show the relationship between Rivera and the editors of the foundational publishing house Quinto Sol. These materials also illustrate the genesis of the novel.
