= H. Palmer Hall =

American poet

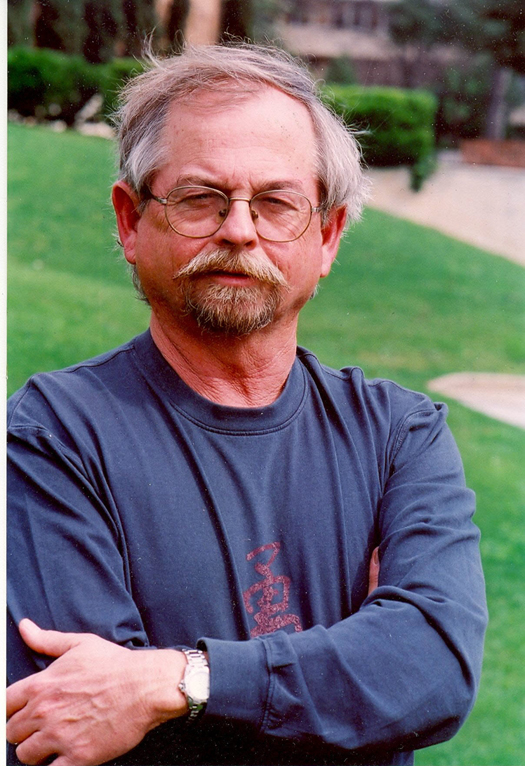
- H. Palmer Hall
- Born: 1 October 1942; Beaumont, Texas
- Occupations: Poet; Essayist; Fiction writer editor Librarian
- Spouse: Susan M. Hall

H. Palmer Hall (1 October 1942 - 9 February 2013) was a poet, fiction writer, essayist, editor, and librarian who lived in San Antonio, Texas. A Vietnam veteran who grew up near the Big Thicket in southeast Texas, Hall's writing often examines themes of war and its impact on the veterans who fight them. His work also examines the environment and how it nourishes us. Called an icon in San Antonio by the Texas Observer magazine, Dr. Hall was inducted into the Texas Institute of Letters (TIL) in 2005.

== Life ==
=== Early life ===
Born Henry Palmer Hall Jr. to Eunice Horn and Henry Palmer Hall Sr. on October 1, 1942 in Beaumont, Texas, Hall attended French High School in Beaumont and graduated in 1960.

=== College and early adulthood ===
H. Palmer Hall received his bachelor's degree in Speech and English from Lamar State College of Technology (now Lamar University) in 1964. For two years Hall taught high school in the Silsbee Independent School District, a rural district 22 miles from Beaumont on the edge of the area known as the Big Thicket. He resigned his teaching position in 1965 in order to pursue graduate studies. Before his student deferment took effect, however, Hall was drafted. After serving in the Vietnam War, he enrolled at the University of Texas at Austin, where he completed master's degrees in English and Librarianship in 1976 and his Ph.D. in English in 1984.

=== Vietnam War ===
Having been summoned by the draft board, Hall opted for recruitment while he retained choice in his status and joined the army as a linguist. He was sent to learn Vietnamese in a 52-week course at the Defense Language Institute East Coast in Washington, DC. During 1967 and 1968 he worked as a Vietnamese interpreter/translator, mostly in Pleiku, Vietnam. Returning to the United States, Hall was sent to work for the National Security Agency (NSA) in Ft. Meade, Maryland. As a result of signing the 1969 petition which appeared in the New York Times calling for an end to the Vietnam War and for marching in anti-war rallies, he was expelled from the Agency. In 1969 he was honorably discharged from the army.

=== Civilian life ===
In 1976 H. Palmer Hall was appointed part-time librarian and English teacher at St. Mary's University in San Antonio, Texas. In 1977 he became Director of the Louis J. Blume Library at St. Mary's University. Since 1990 Dr. Hall has served as co-director of the Pecan Grove Press, a small press sponsored by the Academic Library of St. Mary's University and dedicated to the publication of poetry. Although officially designated co-director, complete editorial control was essentially passed to him by the founder of the press two years after its inception. In his later career as a teacher Dr. Hall has typically offered one course each semester at the St. Mary's English Department in advanced or graduate-level literature studies.

H. Palmer Hall has received public recognition for his contributions. In addition to election to the Texas Institute of Letters, he received the Art of Peace award from the President's Peace Commission of St. Mary's University in 2008. He was also nominated for a Pushcart Prize for his poem, "Vietnam Roulette." Palmer Hall was named Artist of the Month in April, 2010 by the Office of Cultural Affairs in the city of San Antonio.

== Works ==
In his works H. Palmer Hall has drawn upon his experience as a soldier in Vietnam to comment on the war in Vietnam and also on subsequent United States wars. In reviewing his 2009 book, Foreign and Domestic, Roberto Bonazzi states that "Hall's poems about war rank with the best ever written by an American," and poet Will Hochman states, "Hall's Foreign and Domestic establishes him as a war poet whose best work is second to none…" The poet's forms of expression are not limited to the subject of war, however, and he touched upon subjects which range from Nature to racism. In addition to his appearance in publications, Hall gives readings of his work.

=== List of publications ===
- Poetry

From the Periphery: poems and essays. San Antonio: Chili Verde Press, 1994
Deep Thicket & Still Waters. San Antonio: Chili Verde Press, 1999
To Wake Again. Cleveland: Pudding House Publication, 2005
Reflections from Pete's Pond. San Antonio: Pecan Grove Press, 2007
Foreign and Domestic. Cincinnati: Turning Point, 2009

- Fiction

The Home Front and Other Stories. Jasper, TX: Ink Brush Press, 2010

- Essays

Reflections on Publishing, Writing, and Other Things. San Antonio: Pecan Grove Press, 2003
Coming to Terms. Austin: Plain View Press, 2007

- Editor

The Librarian in the University. Metuchen, NJ: Scarecrow Press, 1990
A Measured Response. San Antonio: Pecan Grove Press, 1993
Homage to a Red Wheelbarrow. San Antonio: Pecan Grove Press, 1994
Rites of Spring: a miscellany of flowers. San Antonio: Pecan Grove Press, 1996
Radio! Radio!. San Antonio: Pecan Grove Press, 2000
The Texas Writers’ Newsletter (1997-2000)

Hall's poems, short stories and essays have also appeared in a number of anthologies, including The Practice of Peace, American Diaspora, The XY Files, In a Fine Frenzy and Places to Grow. Journals which have published his works include The Texas Review, The Florida Review, The Texas Observer, Mizna: a journal of Arab American Culture, Briar Cliff Review, Ascent, Small Press Review, WLA: War, Literature & the Arts, Valparaiso Poetry Review, Amarillo Bay, Borderlands, Concho River Review, Descant, Eclectica, Grasslands Review, New Texas, North American Review, Palo Alto Review, Riversedge, Salt River Review, Southern Indiana Review, Sulphur River Literary Review, Timber Creek Review, Windhover, Word Riot and Tattoo Highway.
