= Evangelina Vigil-Piñón =

American poet

- Born: November 29, 1949 (age 76); San Antonio, Texas, U.S.
- Occupations: poet, novelist, director, translator
- Writing career
- Language: English
- Genre: Romance fiction

Evangelina Vigil-Piñón (born November 29, 1949) is a Chicana poet, children's book author, director, translator, and television personality.

== Life ==
Her mother's family emigrated to Texas in the early 1900s from Parras, Mexico. As a child, Vigil-Piñón lived with her maternal grandmother. Her interest in literature started when she was a little girl. As a sixth grader, her principal sent her to the Inman Christian Center, a private art school in San Antonio, where she was in attendance with people in their twenties. Vigil-Piñón earned a scholarship for business administration and started school at Prairie View A&M University. She graduated from the University of Houston. She studied at St. Mary's University, and the University of Texas at San Antonio. She was the assistant editor of Americas Review. She teaches Mexican American and U.S. Hispanic literature as an adjunct lecturer at the University of Houston. She is currently a television journalist extensively involved in community affairs with ABC-KTRK TV Channel 13 in Houston, Texas. Married Mark Anthony Piñón in 1983; they had a son, Marc-Antony Piñón, in 1984.

== Awards ==
- 1983 American Book Award
- National Endowment for the Arts Fellow

== Works ==
- Nade y Nade, M&A Editions, 1978
- Thirty an' Seen a Lot. Arte Público Press. 1982. ISBN 978-0-934770-13-2.
- The Computer is Down. Arte Publico Press. 1987. ISBN 978-0-934770-32-3.
- Marina's Muumuu / El muumuu de Marina. Illustrator Pablo Torrecilla. Arte Público Press. 2001. ISBN 978-1-55885-350-8.

=== Editor ===
- Evangelina Vigil-Piñón, ed. (1987). Woman of Her Word: Hispanic Woman Write. Arte Público Press. ISBN 978-0-934770-27-9.
- Julián Olivares; Evangelina Vigil-Piñón, eds. (1993). Decade II: an anniversary anthology. Arte Publico Press. ISBN 978-1-55885-062-0.

=== Translator ===
- Tomás Rivera (1995). Y no se lo tragó la tierra / And the Earth Did Not Devour Him. Arte Público Press. ISBN 978-1-55885-083-5.
- Tito Campos (2001). Muffler man. Translator Evangelina Vigil-Piñón, Illustrator Lamberto Alvarez. Arte Publico Press. ISBN 978-1-55885-318-8.

=== Anthologies ===
- Roberta Fernández, ed. (1994). In other words: literature by Latinas of the United States. Arte Publico Press. p. 233. ISBN 978-1-55885-110-8. "Evangelina Vigil pinon."
