= Nephtalí De León =

American writer (born 1945)

Nephtalí De León is a Chicano writer known primarily for his poetry, children's stories, and essays. He is also credited with illustrating most of his books. He was born in Laredo, Texas in 1945 as the son of migrant workers. Although neither of his parents received much formal education, De León says that they were responsible for first exposing him to literature. He published his first book, Chicanos: Our Background and Our Pride, in the early 1960s during his senior year of high school. He then expanded his work to include poetry and plays, dabbling in mural art and children's stories on the side. His first children's book entitled I Will Catch the Sun was published in 1973. He was the editor of the newspaper La Voz de los Llanos in Lubbock, Texas from 1968 to 1973. He has been published in Mexico, France, the United States, and Spain with his stories being translated into several other languages, including German, Russian, Chinese, and Vietnamese. Currently, De León is a full-time poet, writer, and painter who performs lectures and poetry at schools and community events.

== Themes of his works ==
De León depicts the "dreams, desires, and aspirations" of the Chicano people. He believes that Chicanos have been "held in psychological and spiritual bondage...and that they are cultural and intellectual hostages in American society". In his works he tries to trace how this predicament has developed throughout history and he also attempts to display the dreams and attitudes of the Chicano people. His writings are based on ancient Aztec language and culture.

== Poet Laureate of San Antonio ==
Nephtali De León was named the sixth Poet Laureate of San Antonio in April 2023. His term was cut short after he posted a poem on social media in July as an elegy for Dr. Roberto "Cintli" Rodriguez that contained a term in the Chicano Caló language which was interpreted as a racial slur. The city subsequently removed him from the position. His five predecessors as poet laureate condemned his actions. During his brief tenure he performed at Viva Poesia for National Poetry Month and San Antonio City Hall. Scheduled events with the Links, Palo Alto College, Gemini Ink, and his service as grand marshal of the El Dieciseis de Septiembre parade were all cancelled following the controversy. In 2024 De León retained lawyers from the New Civil Liberties Alliance to file suit against the City of San Antonio, alleging wrongful termination, breach of contract, defamation, and a violation of his first amendment right to free speech.

== Works ==
- Chicanos: our background and our pride Trucha Publications. 1972. ISBN 9780912878003
- Chicano Poet: With Images and Visions of the Poet Trucha Publications. 1973. ISBN 9780912878010
- I Will Catch the Sun Trucha Publications. 1973.
- Coca-Cola Dream Trucha Publications. 1976.
- La LLorona: A Spirit Unable to Rest 2020.ISBN 9798637887347
