= Juan Felipe Herrera =

American writer (born 1948)

- Born: December 27, 1948 (age 77); Fowler, California, U.S.
- Education: University of California, Los Angeles (BA); Stanford University (MA); University of Iowa (MFA)
- Partner: Margarita Robles
- Writing career
- Language: English; Spanish
- Genre: Poetry
- Movement: Chicano

United States Poet Laureate
- In office 2015–2017
- Preceded by: Charles Wright
- Succeeded by: Tracy K. Smith

Juan Felipe Herrera (born on December 27, 1948) is an American poet, performer, writer, cartoonist, teacher, and activist. Herrera was the 21st United States poet laureate from 2015 to 2017. He is a major figure in the literary field of Chicano poetry.

Herrera's experiences as the child of migrant farmers have strongly shaped his work, such as the children's book Calling the Doves, which won the Ezra Jack Keats Book Award in 1997. Community and art have always been part of what has driven Herrera, beginning in the mid-1970s, when he was director of the Centro Cultural de la Raza, an occupied water tank in Balboa Park that had been converted into an arts space for the community.

Herrera’s publications include fourteen collections of poetry, prose, short stories, young adult novels and picture books for children, with twenty-one books in total in the last decade. His 2007 volume 187 Reasons Mexicanos Can't Cross the Border: Undocuments 1971-2007 contains texts in both Spanish and English that examine the cultural hybridity that "revolve around questions of identity" on the U.S.-Mexico border. Herrera was awarded the 2008 National Book Critics Circle Award in Poetry for Half the World in Light. In 2012, he was appointed California Poet Laureate by Gov. Jerry Brown.

In 2011, Herrera was elected a chancellor of the Academy of American Poets. In 2015, Herrera was appointed as the nation's first Chicano or, more broadly, Latino poet laureate.

On June 11, 2016, Herrera was awarded an honorary doctorate from Oregon State University. In August 2022, Juan Felipe Herrera Elementary School opened as part of Fresno Unified School District.

== Early life and education ==
Born in 1948 and son of farm workers María de la Luz Quintana and Felipe Emilio Herrera, Juan Felipe Herrera lived from crop to crop and from tractor to trailer to tents on the roads of the San Joaquín Valley and the Salinas Valley. Herrera graduated from San Diego High School in 1967 and received the Educational Opportunity Program scholarship to attend the University of California, Los Angeles where he received his B.A. in Social Anthropology. Later, he received his master's degree in social anthropology from Stanford University, and his Master of Fine Arts in creative writing from the University of Iowa. In 1990, he was a distinguished teaching fellow at the University of Iowa Writers’ Workshop. After serving as chair of the Chicano and Latin American Studies Department at California State University, Fresno, in 2005, Herrera joined the creative writing department at University of California, Riverside, as the Tomás Rivera Endowed Chair. He also became director of the Art and Barbara Culver Center for the Arts, a new multimedia space in downtown Riverside.

Herrera resides in Redlands, California with his partner Margarita Robles, a performance artist and poet. He has five children.

== Influences ==
Herrera's experience as a campesino has strongly influenced his works. Traveling from the San Joaquín Valley to San Diego's Logan Heights, and San Francisco's Mission District has left him three distinct Californias from which he draws inspiration. Growing up in the '60s and attending college in the '70s during the Chicano Movement and more experimental writing such as the Beat Poets, writers like Luis Valdez and Allen Ginsberg inspired Herrera. The great era of artistic experimentation has also inspired his writing style in which he challenges the borders between styles, forms, schools, and genres.

Herrera, a writer constantly crossing borders, often writes about social issues. Ilan Stavans, a Mexican American essayist once said, "there is one constant in the past three decades in Chicano literature and his name is Juan Felipe Herrera. Aesthetically, he leaps over so many canons that he winds up on the outer limits of urban song." New York Times critic Stephanie Burt praised Herrera as one of the first poets to successfully create "a new hybrid art, part oral, part written, part English, part something else: an art grounded in ethnic identity, fueled by collective pride, yet irreducibly individual too."

== Community arts ==
Herrera has received grants to teach poetry, art and performance in several different settings, including community art galleries such as the Galería de la Raza in San Francisco, California, in 1983–85, develop community art and literature broadsides (1977–1978) in San Diego, California, teach poetry in prisons (Soledad Correctional Facility, 1987–88). His current work focuses on working with community colleges and schools in Riverside County and in the Coachella Valley.

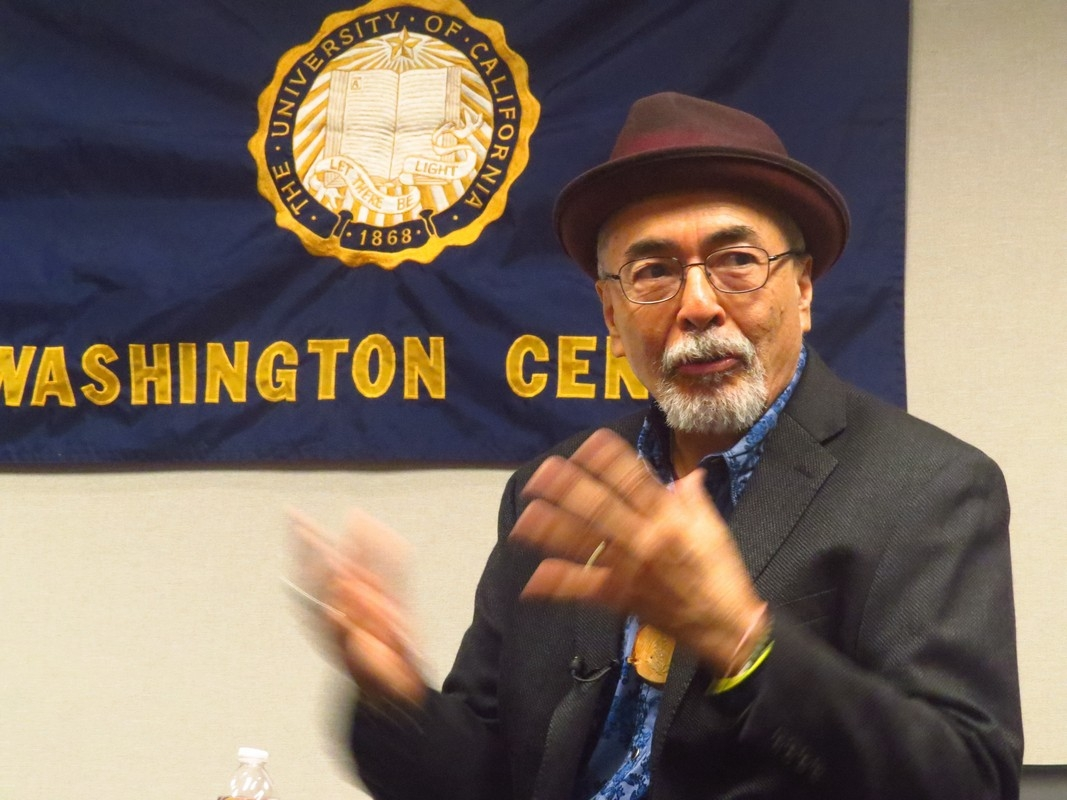
Juan Felipe Herrera at the University of California, Washington Center, April 24, 2017

After being named California’s Poet Laureate by Governor Jerry Brown in 2012, Herrera created the i-Promise Joanna/Yo te Prometo Joanna Project, an anti-bullying poetry project. Joanna was an elementary school girl who was bullied and killed in an afterschool fight. The first half asks students to send in poems about the effects of bullying. The second half of the project is to take action in preventing bullying. He hopes to collect the poems and publish it as a book in the future.

== Awards and fellowships ==
- Americas Award
- 2008 National Book Critics Circle Award in Poetry for Half the World in Light
- 2009 PEN/Beyond Margins Award
- 2010 Guggenheim Fellowship
- Breadloaf Fellowship in Poetry
- California Arts Council grants (awarded four times)
- Cooperative Children’s Book Center Choice
- Focal Award
- Ezra Jack Keats Award, for Calling the Doves
- Hungry Mind Award of Distinction
- Independent Publisher Book Award
- IRA Teacher’s Choice
- Latino Hall of Fame Poetry Awards (twice awarded)
- Los Angeles Times Book Award Nomination
- National Endowment for the Arts Writers’ Fellowship Awards (twice awarded)
- New York Public Library Outstanding Book for High School Students Award
- Pura Belpré Honors Award
- Smithsonian Children’s Book of the Year Award
- Stanford Chicano Fellows Fellowship
- Texas Blue Bonnet Nomination
- UC Berkeley Regent's Fellowship
- 2017 PEN Oakland Josephine Miles Award
- 2021 Los Angeles Review of Books/UC Riverside Creative Writing Lifetime Achievement Award
- 2023 Frost Medal
- 2024 MacArthur Fellow

== Bibliography ==
- Rebozos of Love. Tolteca Publications. 1974.
- Exiles of Desire. Arte Publico Press. University of Houston. 1985.
- Facegames. Dragon Cloud Press. 1987.
- Akrílica. Alcatraz Editions. 1989.
- Memoria(s) from an Exile's Notebook of the Future. Santa Monica College Press. 1993. [Poetry Chapbook]
- The Roots of a Thousand Embraces: Dialogues. Manic D Press. San Francisco. 1994.
- Night Train to Tuxtla: New Stories and Poems. University of Arizona. 1994.
- Calling the Doves / Canto a Las Palomas. San Francisco, CA: Children's Book Press. 1995. ISBN 978-0-89239-166-0. [Bilingual children's story]. Fall 1995
- Love After the Riots. Curbstone Press. Willimantic, NY. 1996
- Mayan Drifter: Chicano Poet in the Lowlands of America. Temple University Press. Philadelphia, Pa. Spring 1997.
- Border-Crosser with a Lamborghini Dream. University of Arizona Press. 1999.
- Loteria Cards & Fortune Poems. City Lights Publishers. SF. Fall, 1999.
- CrashBoomLove: A Novel in Verse. University of New Mexico. Fall 1999. ISBN 978-0-8263-2114-5. "Juan Felipe Herrera."
- The Upside Down Boy/El Nino de Cabeza. Children's Book Press, SF. 2000.
- Thunderweavers. University of Arizona Press, Tucson. 2000.
- Giraffe on Fire. Poems. University of Arizona Press. Tucson. 2001.
- Grandma & Me at the Flea / Los Meros Meros Remateros. San Francisco, CA: Children’s Books Press. 2002. ISBN 978-0-89239-171-4.
- Notebooks of a Chile Verde Smuggler. University of Arizona Press, Tucson. 2002.
- Super Cilantro Girl / La Superniña del Cilantro. San Francisco, CA: Children’s Book Press. 2003. ISBN 978-0-89239-187-5.
- Coralito's Bay / La Bahia de Coralito. Monterey National Marine Sanctuary. Monterey. 2004
- Cinnamon Girl: Letters Found Inside a Cereal Box. HarperCollins, Joanna Cotler Books /Tempest. New York. 2005. ISBN 978-0-06-057984-5
- Downtown Boy. Scholastic Press. Scholastic. New York. 2005.
- 187 Reasons Mexicanos Can't Cross The Border: Undocuments 1971-2007, (City Lights Publishers, 2007) ISBN 978-0-87286-462-7
- Half the World in Light. University of Arizona Press. 2008.
- Notes on the Assemblage. (City Lights Publishers, 2015) ISBN 978-0-87286-710-9.
- Every Day We Get More Illegal. (City Lights Publishers, 2020) ISBN 978-0-87286-828-1.

List of poems

Title	Year	First published	Reprinted/collected
Basho & Mandela	2020	Herrera, Juan Felipe (September 7, 2020). "Basho & Mandela". The New Yorker. Vol. 96, no. 26. p. 63.	

== Film, stage, and music ==
Herrera produced "The Twin Tower Songs," a San Joaquin Valley performance memorial on the September 11, 2001, attacks and writes (poetry sequences) for the PBS television series American Family. His recent musical, The Upside Down Boy, was well received in New York City, produced by Making Books Sing, libretto by Barbara Zinn Krieger. Lyrics by Juan Felipe Herrera and Music by Cristian Amigo. Mr. Herrera is a board member of the Before Columbus American Book Awards Foundation and the California Council for the Humanities.

On September 8, 2015, at the Library of Congress on the day that he was inducted as poet laureate, Herrera, the Chicago-Mexican son band Sones de Mexico, and their songwriting class, cowrote the ballad "Corrida de Sandra Bland", in Spanish, to honor the Chicago woman who had died in police custody in Texas. Sones de Mexico performed the song the next day.

In October 2016, LightBox Theatre Company, a non-profit theatre for young audiences in Turlock, Calif., presented a world premiere production of The Super Cilantro Girl, based on three of Herrera's children's books. The play, written by California State University, Stanislaus professor Arnold Anthony Schmidt and directed by Stefani Tsai, is based on "The Upside Down Boy," "Calling the Doves" and "Super Cilantro Girl."

== Theater ==
Juan Felipe Herrera founded a number of performance ensembles during the last three decades:

- Teatro Tolteca (UCLA, 1971 – a choreopoem theatre utilizing jazz, spoken-word and movement),
- TROKA (Bay Area, 1983, a percussion/spoken word ensemble),
- Teatro Zapata, (Fresno, Ca., 1990 – a student community theatre),
- Manikrudo: Raw Essence (Fresno, Ca., 1993, a culturally diverse, performance art ensemble and workshop),
- Teatro Ambulante de Salud/The Traveling Health Theatre (2003, Fresno, Ca. for migrant communities in the San Joaquin Valley) and
- Verbal Coliseum – A Spoken Word Ensemble (UC Riverside, 2006),
- "Prison Journal," an experimental play was featured at the University of Iowa Playwright’s Festival, 1990. Latin@ Theatre/Movement Improv training: Luis Valdez/Teatro Campesino, Enrique Buenaventura, Rodrigo Duarte-Clark, Olivia Chumacero, Jorge Huerta, James Donlon.
