= Carlos Cumpián =

American writer

- Born: August 22, 1953 (age 73); San Antonio, Texas, U.S.

Carlos Cumpián is an American Chicano writer who examines American realities absent from mainstream poetry. Originally from San Antonio, Texas, Cumpián has planted firm roots in the Midwest.

Cumpián was named among the Chicago Public Library's "Top Ten" requested poets and his poetry has been published in small press magazines as well as numerous anthologies. He has taught at Columbia College Chicago and has offered workshops on poetry and small press management. His books "14 Abriles: Poems" (March Abrazo Press), Latino Rainbow (Children's Press/Scholastic Books), Armadillo Charm (Tia Chucha Press) and Coyote Sun (March Abrazo Press) have received positive reviews for their contributions to Chicano literature.

Cumpián is also the editor of March Abrazo Press and has been instrumental in the longevity of the small press and establishing its presence as an independent publisher of Latino and Native American poetry. Carlos currently teaches high school English in Chicago and works to provide quality education to inner-city high school youth.

== Writings ==
- 14 Abriles: Poems, March Abrazo Press, Chicago, 2010
- Armadillo Charm, Tia Chucha Press, L.A. 1996 (2nd printing, 1998)
- Latino Rainbow: Poems about Latino Americans, Children's Press, Scholastic Books, Danbury, Conn., 1994 (available in hardcover, paperback and teacher's guide editions)
- Coyote Sun, March Abrazo Press, Chicago, 1990 (4th printing, 2005)

He is also published in more than 20 poetry and literary anthologies, such as Hecho en Tejas (Made in Texas): An Anthology of Texas Mexican Literature (University of New Mexico Press, 2006) and Telling Stories: An Anthology for Writers, ed. Joyce Carol Oates (W.W. Norton, New York, 1998).
