= Tomás Rivera =

American poet

3rd Chancellor of the University of California, Riverside
- In office 1979–1984
- Preceded by: Ivan Hinderaker
- Succeeded by: Theodore L. Hullar

Personal details
- Born: December 22, 1935 Crystal City, Texas
- Died: May 16, 1984 (aged 48) Fontana, California
- Spouse: Concepción Rivera
- Education: Southwest Texas State University; University of Oklahoma
- Occupation: Writer; poet; educator
- Writing career
- Notable work: ...y no se lo tragó la tierra

Tomás Rivera (December 22, 1935 – May 16, 1984) was a Mexican American author, poet, and educator. He was born in Texas to migrant farm workers, and worked in the fields as a young boy. However, he achieved social mobility through education—earning a degree at Southwest Texas State University (now known as Texas State University), and later a Doctor of Philosophy degree (PhD) at the University of Oklahoma—and came to believe strongly in the virtues of education for Mexican-Americans.

As an author, Rivera is best remembered for his 1971 Faulknerian stream-of-consciousness novella ...y no se lo tragó la tierra, translated into English variously as This Migrant Earth and as ...and the Earth Did Not Devour Him. This book won the first Premio Quinto Sol award.

Rivera taught in high schools throughout the Southwest US, and later at Sam Houston State University and the University of Texas at El Paso. From 1979 until his death in 1984, he was the chancellor of the University of California, Riverside, the first Mexican-American to hold such a position at the University of California.

== Biography ==
=== Early years ===
Rivera was born on December 22, 1935, in Crystal City, Texas, to Spanish-speaking, migrant farmworkers, Florencio and Josefa Rivera. At eleven years old, Rivera was in a car accident in Bay City, Michigan. After the accident, Rivera decided to write his first story about the wreck and called it "The Accident". In an interview with Juan D. Bruce-Novoa, Rivera explains: "I felt a sensation I still get when I write. I wanted to capture something I would never forget and it happened to be the sensation of having a wreck". Rivera continued writing throughout high school, creative pieces as well as essays. He dreamed of being a sportswriter as an adult, inspired by what he read most, sports articles and adventure stories. In the same article, Rivera explains the reality of growing up with ambitions to be a writer in a migrant worker family. He explains that "When people asked what I wanted to be, I'd tell them a writer. They were surprised or indifferent. If people don't read, what is a writer?". His grandfather was his main supporter, though, and provided him with supplies and encouragement.

Rivera worked in the fields alongside his family during summer vacations and often missed school because of the overlapping work-season. At the beginning of every school term, he had to catch up on missed material from the preceding year. The family labored with many other migrant workers in various parts of the Midwest: they lived and worked in Iowa, Minnesota, Wisconsin, Michigan and North Dakota. Rivera worked as a field labourer until 1956; at this point he was enrolled in Southwest Texas Junior College and the school would not permit him to miss class. This signified the end of his migrant working days and the beginning of a new life.

The first-hand experience Rivera had from growing up as a migrant worker provided him with writing material for his literary works. His novel ...y no se lo tragó la tierra is semi-autobiographical and is based around the migratory life of a young boy. As Rivera grew up in the late 20th century, he discovered some of the difficulties Chicanos faced as lower-class Mexican descendants. While trying to get published, Rivera encountered some racism; this was mainly because his writings were in Spanish, thus restricting his audience. The unjust and frustrating situation faced by many Chicanos motivated Rivera. He understood that the only way to get ahead in life was through education. Rivera graduated with a degree in English from the Southwest Texas State University in 1958 and taught English and Spanish at secondary schools from 1957 to 1965. He strongly believed that post-secondary education was the only way Chicanos could evolve from migrant work. He worked in public schools until he could further his education at the University of Oklahoma, where he graduated with a PhD in Romance Languages and Literature in 1969. Rivera's extensive education gave him the step up that he needed. Rivera was (and is) a role-model for young Chicanos throughout the United States because of his involvement in the community and his success as a scholar and writer.

He married Concepción Garza on November 27, 1958. The couple had two daughters, Ileana and Irasema, and one son, Javier. In an article commemorating Rivera's life, Rolando Hinojosa remembers Tomás and Concepción (Concha) as party hosts, writing that although they were both extremely hard workers, they knew how to enjoy themselves and their door was always open to whoever wanted. Hinojosa comments that the pair "loved each other as much as they loved life".

=== Education and career ===
It was customary for Chicanos of the Midwest to live the majority of their lives workings in the fields, an occurrence Rivera included in ...y no se lo tragó la tierra. Despite the fact that his Chicano culture was rooted in migratory field work, Rivera not only graduated from secondary school but moved quickly through his post-secondary education. Rivera graduated from Crystal City High School in Texas in 1954. He then majored in English at Southwest Texas Jr. College in 1956. Immediately thereafter, he attended Southwest Texas State University. Here, he had earned a B.A. in English with minors in Spanish, History and Education by 1958. At the same school, Rivera earned a M.Ed. in Educational Administration in 1964, where he met Salvador Humberto Gómez. Rivera earned all of his post-secondary degrees while he was working as a high school teacher. He taught both Spanish and English at schools in League City, Crystal City and San Antonio, Texas. He also taught Spanish and French at Southwest Texas Junior College. By 1969, Rivera had received a Ph.D. in Romance languages and Literature, as well as a M.A. in Spanish literature, both from the University of Oklahoma.

Upon completing his Ph.D., Rivera taught as an associate professor at Sam Houston State University until 1971. He then became a professor of Spanish at University of Texas at San Antonio. In 1973, he was appointed an associate dean and in 1975 became a vice-president. He became the executive vice president of the University of Texas at El Paso in 1978. Rivera worked as corporate officer of the Times Mirror Company before leaving to become chancellor of the University of California, Riverside in 1979, a position he held until his death in 1984. While working in his various administrative roles, Rivera insisted that he continue teaching, despite it no longer being required: highlighting his dedication to higher education. Rivera chose to include migrant labor in his Curriculum Vita, a sign that he never forgot his beginnings, history or true identity. Above all, according to Hinojosa, Rivera considered himself to be a professor.

=== Literary career ===
In addition to his other achievements, Rivera contributed greatly to the literary world with his short stories, poetry and scholarly works. But he is best known for his novel, ...y no se lo tragó la tierra (1971); for which he received the first Premio Quinto Sol literary award in 1971. Quinto Sol was a publishing house founded in 1967 by UC Berkeley students and faculty to disseminate Chicano/a literature and culture. They created the Premio Quinto Sol literary prize to recognize and promote Chicano authors.

The novel has since been translated into English several times: by Herminio Ríos-C as "...And the Earth Did Not Part"; by Evangelina Vigil-Piñón as "...And the Earth Did Not Devour Him"; and most recently by Rolando Hinojosa as This Migrant Earth. In 2012, the first Latin American edition of …y no se lo tragó la tierra was published with an extensive introduction by Julio Ramos and Gustavo Buenrostro. The volume also includes appendices that explain the genesis of the novel and the relationship between Rivera and the editors of Quinto Sol.

==== ...y no se lo tragó la tierra ====
...y no se lo tragó la tierra is a novel divided into fourteen vignettes. The book opens with a section called "El año perdido" (The Lost Year) told from the perspective of an anonymous Chicano child, the son of two migrant workers. The unnamed child narrates some of the sections with his thoughts, memories and impressions while other people connected to his life narrate the remaining sections. The narrations come in many varying forms, from dialogue and prayer to descriptive passages. The varying perspectives form a collective narrative that piece together the events occurring over the past year of the child's life, prefaced in the first chapter. The reasoning behind having an anonymous protagonist and irregular form is left for the reader to infer.

=== Civic activities ===
Rivera was very active in each community he lived in. A memorial letter from the University of California, on behalf of the Regents, states that he had "a strong voice in both the nation and the community in recognizing that our youth is a resource beyond measure". He served on many distinguished advisory committees such as the Carnegie Foundation for the Advancement of Teaching, the American Association for Higher Education, the American Council on Education, the President's Commission on a National Agenda for the 80s and the National Commission on Secondary Schooling for Hispanics.

Rivera was presented with an award from the Chicano News Media Association for outstanding achievements and contributions to the Chicano community, and also received an award from the Riverside Chapter of the National Association for the Advancement of Colored People for his leadership as Chancellor at the Riverside Campus.

In addition, Rivera sat on the board of committees or was a member of the following public service groups: American Association for the Advancement of Science (1983–4), Council on Foreign Relations (1983–4), Carnegie Commission on the Future of Public Broadcasting (1977–9), the National Hispanic Scholarship Fund (1979–84), the Human Resources Management and Development Program (1979–84), the Citizens' Goals for Greater Riverside Area (1981–84), the Riverside Community Hospital Corporation (1981–2), the Greater Riverside Hispanic Chambers of Commerce (1981–84) and the Association for the Advancement of Mexican Americans (1977–79) amongst many others.

== Legacy ==
Rivera died on May 16, 1984 in his Fontana home of a heart attack. His sudden death was a "great shock" to the University of California. At the request of UC President David P. Gardner, UC Irvine's founding chancellor Daniel Aldrich came out of retirement to serve as UC Riverside's acting chancellor while the campus mourned Rivera's loss and began searching for his permanent replacement.

Rivera is remembered as a gifted teacher, consummate administrator and acclaimed poet by many. After his death, many plazas, schools and certifications were named in his honor: a University of Texas at Austin professorship, the primary University of California, Riverside library and a plaza (as mentioned above), a Riverside Unified School District elementary school, a Denton, Texas elementary school, a Val Verde Unified School District middle school, a Crystal City (his hometown) elementary school, a Mexican-American children's book, an honorary doctorate from Santa Clara University and was named a distinguished alumnus by Texas State University. His work is studied in courses of American and Mexican-American literature, and the Tomás Rivera Policy Institute bearing his name continues to publish studies on educational, immigration, economic, and other issues important to Hispanic-Americans.

At the University of Texas at San Antonio, a tutoring center is named in his honor. At Texas State University Student Center Drive was renamed Tomas Rivera Drive in his honor. In 1995, the College of Education at Texas State established the Tomás Rivera Mexican American Children's Book Award (Tomás Rivera Award) "to honor authors and illustrators who create literature that depicts the Mexican American experience"; winners have included such notable authors as Rudolfo Anaya, Pat Mora, and Gary Soto.

In the year following his death, the General Library at UC Riverside was renamed the Tomás Rivera Library. His wife, Concepción Rivera donated all of her late husband's papers to be put on loan at this library. The archive now contains all of Rivera's work, more than 85,000 items. The contents of this archive are indicative of his hardworking, selfless and motivated nature. Not only did Rivera leave this world with buildings, plazas and learning centers in his name, he left an imprint on future generations of Chicanos. Above all, Rivera had a vision for the world: that generations of migrant workers following his own would have equitable access to post-secondary education and opportunities to succeed. Annually, the Tomás Rivera Conference, founded in 1988, is held at the University of California, Riverside, which provides a venue for reflecting on the contributions of Chicanos/Latinos in the arts, culture, literature, creative writing, business, medicine and education.

== Works ==
Editions of Tierra

- Rivera, Tomás (1971) ...y no se lo tragó la tierra/...And the Earth Did Not Part. Trans by Herminio Rios, Berkeley: Quinto Sol.
- Rivera, Tomás (1977) ...y no se lo tragó la tierra/...And the Earth Did Not Part. Trans by Herminio Rios, Berkeley: Justa Publications. ISBN 0-915808-09-9
- Rivera, Tomás (1987) ...y no se lo tragó la tierra/...And the Earth Did Not Devour Him. Trans by Evangelina Vigil-Piñón, Houston: Arte Público Press. ISBN 1-558850-83-X
- Rivera, Tomás (1996) ...y no se lo tragó la tierra". Houston: Arte Público Press. ISBN 978-1558851-51-1
- Rivera, Tomás (2012) ...y no se lo tragó la tierra". Edition and Introduction by Julio Ramos, Gustavo Buenrostro and Jean-Luc Nancy, Buenos Aires: Ediciones Corregidor. ISBN 978-9500520-10-2

Other prose

- Rivera, Tomás (1987), This Migrant Earth, Trans. Rolando Hinojosa, Houston: Arte Público, ISBN 0-934770-55-7.

Poetry

- Rivera, Tomás (1973), Always and Other Poems, Sisterdale, TX: Sisterdale, OCLC 6065690.
- Rivera, Tomás (1990), Olivares, Julián (ed.), The Searchers : Collected Poetry, Houston: Arte Público, ISBN 978-1-55885-018-7.
- Rivera, Tomás (1991), Olivares, Julián (ed.), Tomás Rivera: The Complete Works, Houston: Arte Público, ISBN 978-1-55885-039-2.

Film

- ...And the Earth Did Not Devour Him. American Playhouse Theatrical Films presents a production of KPBS and Severo Pérez Films; produced by Paul Espinosa; written and directed by Severo Pérez. New York, NY: Kino International. Kino Video, 1997.

Works and editions
https://faculty.ucmerced.edu/mmartin-rodriguez/index_files/vhRiveraTomas.htm
