= Lucha Corpi =

American poet (born 1945)

Lucha Corpi is a Chicana poet and mystery writer. She was born on April 13, 1945, in Jaltipan, Veracruz, Mexico. In 1975, she earned a B.A. degree in comparative literature from the University of California, Berkeley. In 1979, she earned an M.A. in comparative literature from San Francisco State University. Corpi's most important contribution to Chicano literature, a series of four poems called "The Marina Poems", appeared in the anthology The Other Voice: Twentieth-Century Women's Poetry in Translation, which was published by W. W. Norton & Company, in 1976.

She tends to write her short stories in English and her poems in Spanish.

== Personal life and career ==
Corpi's family was from the southern part of Veracruz. Her paternal grandparents were Italian, Hispanic with Native American ancestry; of her maternal grandparents, one was surnamed Constantino and the other was three-quarters Mexican. Her family insisted she and her six sisters and two brothers all be educated. Her elder brother would not attend school without her, which explanation led to an agreement with the school allowing her to sit in the back of the classroom.

In 1964, she married Guillermo Hernández and they immigrated to the United States so that he could study at the University of California at Berkeley. They divorced in 1970 and she started taking classes at the University of California at Berkeley, where she earned her BA degree in comparative literature.

In 1969, divorced and with a small child, she began writing poetry; her first publication was in a Norton anthology, followed by work in an anthology with other Mexican writers.

From 1970 to 1971, she was the vice-chair of Chicano Studies executive committee at University of California, Berkeley. From 1970 to 1972, she was the coordinator of Chicano Studies Library. She is a founding member, Aztlán Cultural and Centro Chicano de Escritores. She is a member of the Oakland Museum and Latin American Commission.

== Selected works ==
- Fireflight: Three Latin American Poets, With Elsie Alvarado de Ricord and Concha Michel, Oyez, 1976.
- Palabras de mediodia/Noon Words, Fuego de Aztlan, 1980 ISBN 9781558853225
- Delia's Song, Arte Publico, 1989 ISBN 9780934770828
- Eulogy For A Brown Angel : A Mystery Novel, Arte Publico, 1992 ISBN 9781558850507
- Cactus Blood, Arte Publico, 1995 ISBN 9781558851344
- Where Fireflies Dance, Children's Book Press, 1997 ISBN 9780892391776
- Black Widow's Wardrobe, Arte Publico, 1999 ISBN 9781558852884
- Crimson Moon, Arte Publico, 2004 ISBN 9781558854215
- Death at Solstice, Arte Publico, 2009

== Reception of works ==
Corpi's books have received mixed reviews. Publishers Weekly called Palabras de mediodia/Noon Words "her dawn". Of Eulogy For A Brown Angel: A Mystery Novel, Kirkus Reviews wrote, "Corpi brings a Chicana feminist perspective to the mystery genre and does so with enough originality to overcome some stilted and murky writing" concluding, "Awkward and slow moving at times, but still worthwhile mystery-reading", while Publishers Weekly wrote: "A haze of dazzlingly evocative prose very nearly hides this first mystery's slack plotting. Corpi's ear for Latino rhythms and her feminist leanings produce some original and highly charged narrative moments. But plot still matters...Although careful readers might anticipate the solution and wish for a few more suspects, Corpi expands the genre with this work of small triumphs."

Kirkus Reviews was critical of Cactus Blood, calling it, "A well-nigh impenetrable mystery full of stilted dialogue, murky scene-setting, wild poetry, and furious evocations of the 1973 grape boycott and 1989 Oakland earthquake", while Publishers Weekly wrote: "Corpi writes convincingly about Gloria's attempts to interpret her visions and does a fine job depicting decent people handling dangerous situations. But many moments of harking-back and a rash of coincidences slow the narrative."

== Awards ==
- National Endowment for the Arts creative writing fellowship in 1979
- First place in the Palabra Nueva literary competition for her short story "Los cristos del alma" in 1983
- First place in the Chicano Literary Contest held at the University of California, Irvine, in 1984
- Her first mystery novel, Eulogy for a Brown Angel, which won the Multicultural Publishers Exchange Best Book of Fiction award in 1992.
- PEN Oakland Josephine Miles Literary Prize in fiction
- Named poet laureate at Indiana University Northwest

== Publications ==
- The Other Voice: Twentieth-Century Women's Poetry in Translation, 1976. (ISBN 9780393044218)
