= Spatial and Discursive Violence in the US Southwest =

2021 book by Rosaura Sanchez and Beatrice Pita

- Author: Rosaura Sánchez and Beatrice Pita
- Language: English
- Subject: Land dispossession, settler colonialism, Chicano/a and Native American literature, US Southwest history
- Publisher: Duke University Press
- Publication date: April 2021
- Media type: Print, e-book
- Pages: 272
- ISBN: 978-1-4780-2129-2

Spatial and Discursive Violence in the US Southwest is a 2021 book by Rosaura Sánchez and Beatrice Pita, both of the University of California, San Diego, published by Duke University Press. Sánchez and Pita document literary representations of land dispossession and settler colonialism in the history of New Mexico, Texas, and Oklahoma, analyzing Chicano/a and Native American novels, autobiographies, and other cultural texts from the eighteenth century to the present. Based on the Marxist concept of enclosure as an ongoing process that separates producers from the means of production, the authors trace how Spanish, Mexican, and US colonial powers sequentially appropriated Indigenous and later Mexican-held lands through force, legislation, fraud, and governmental policy, and how these processes have been configured in literature. They argue that spatial violence in the form of land seizure has always been accompanied by discursive violence in the form of legal frameworks, racial ideologies, and narrative erasures that legitimize dispossession, and that literature, given its capacity to represent multiple temporalities and lived experience, can register dimensions of this history that conventional historiography tends to overlook. A central concern of the work is that Chicano/a literature has often celebrated an idealized colonial Spanish past to counter stereotypes of Mexican racial inferiority while simultaneously erasing the participation of Spanish and Mexican settlers in the dispossession of Indigenous peoples.

== Summary ==
The book is a work of literary and historical criticism in which Sánchez and Pita document how processes of land dispossession across several centuries in the American Southwest have been represented (and at times obscured) in Chicano/a and Native American literature. They base their work in the Marxist concept of "enclosure," which they define not as a one-time historical event but as "an ongoing and recurrent process of dispossession and privatization" that has continuously separated producers from their means of subsistence. Based on the theoretical work of Massimo De Angelis, George Caffentzis, David Harvey, and others, they argue that spatial violence (the physical taking of land) and discursive violence (the ideological justifications, legal frameworks, and narrative erasures that accompany it) are always correlated. The authors move between detailed historical contextualization and close readings of novels, autobiographies, and other cultural texts, treating literature as a register uniquely capable of capturing the "multilayered temporalities" and lived experiences that conventional historiography tends to flatten.

In the introduction, the authors lay out their central theoretical apparatus and announce several pointed interventions. They challenge what they see as the limitations of culturalist and decolonial frameworks prevalent in contemporary Chicano/a and Latino/a studies, arguing that these approaches privilege epistemic liberation over material analysis and often develop "a selective amnesia for our role in the colonization of the native peoples of the Southwest." They insist that most people of Mexican origin in the United States today are not direct descendants of the original Spanish or Mexican colonizers but of later immigrants, and that the celebratory emphasis on Spanish ancestry found in much Nuevomexicano/a and Tejano/a writing functions as a form of discursive violence in its own right—one that erases Indigenous dispossession and asserts whiteness as cultural capital.

The first chapter provides a historical overview of the various modalities of colonialism that shaped the Southwest, distinguishing between military conquest, the mission system, the encomienda, and settler colonialism as practiced sequentially by Spain, Mexico, and the United States. The authors trace how property relations in the colonizing countries (feudal in Spain, increasingly capitalist in England) determined the forms land tenure would take in the Americas, and they situate Southwest dispossession within a broader global history of enclosures, from sixteenth-century England to nineteenth-century Argentina. They use Paul W. Gates's extensive history of US public land policy to show how federal legislation ostensibly designed to support small farmers (the Homestead Act, the Preemption Act, the Desert Land Act) was systematically exploited by speculators and corporations, so that "of the 500 million acres granted by the General Land Office between 1862 and 1904, only eighty million went to homesteaders."

Chapter two focuses on Indigenous dispossession in Oklahoma, anchored by an extended reading of Linda Hogan's 1990 novel Mean Spirit. This is the book's most sustained engagement with a single literary work, and multiple reviewers identified it as the strongest chapter for the depth it achieves through concentrated analysis. Sánchez and Pita read Hogan's fictionalized chronicle of the Osage murders of the 1920s as a narrative that recovers critical memory of the many strategies used to separate Native Americans from their land and resources: military force, treaties, the Dawes Act's forced privatization, the guardian system, fraud, marriage to Indigenous women as a means of inheriting headrights, and consumerism. They argue that Hogan's novel functions as a type of noir narrative in which "the perpetrator is now, more often than not, the system itself, that is, the state, its agents, and capitalism." The chapter extends beyond Mean Spirit to discuss Hogan's other novels—namely Power (1999), Solar Storms (1995), and People of the Whale (2009)—as well as works by Leslie Marmon Silko, tracing how each configures different modalities of enclosure, from the hydroelectric damming of Cree lands in Quebec to the ecological destruction of Florida's Taiga people.

The authors try to emphasize the role of women and the importance of communal land as both a material and spiritual resource, reminding of Marx's late-life interest in Indigenous commons as a potential "fulcrum for social regeneration." The inclusion of Oklahoma in a study of the US Southwest represents a notable spatial reframing, as the state falls outside the territory acquired in the US-Mexican War and is not typically grouped with New Mexico, Texas, and California in Chicano/a studies.

The third chapter covers the longest chronological span—from pre-contact Pueblo settlements through twenty-first-century water rights conflicts. Here the authors study a wide array of texts: Gaspar Perez de Villagra's 1610 epic poem on the Acoma massacre, Eusebio Chacon's late-nineteenth-century essays and novellas, the Federal Writers' Project testimonies that document debt peonage, Cleofas Jaramillo's autobiographical sketches, Fabiola Cabeza de Baca's We Fed Them Cactus, Nash Candelaria's historical novels, Fray Angelico Chavez's short stories, Miguel Antonio Otero Jr.'s account of Billy the Kid, and Rudolfo Anaya's detective fiction. A central argument of this chapter is that Nuevomexicano/a literature has overwhelmingly adopted the perspective of the landed elite, celebrating Spanish ancestry and cultural traditions while eliding the enslavement and dispossession of Indigenous peoples under both Spanish and Mexican rule. Sanchez and Pita note, for instance, that Jaramillo presents the Tierra Amarilla grant (historically a communal grant) as her family's private property, and that Cabeza de Baca idealizes master-servant relations on haciendas where debt peonage was the norm. The chapter also traces armed resistance, including the 1837 Chimayo Rebellion, the Taos Revolt of 1847, and the Gorras Blancas fence-cutting campaigns of the 1890s, observing that these movements are often distorted or dismissed in the literary record. The chapter closes with Anaya's novels about water rights struggles, connecting historical land dispossession to contemporary enclosures of vital resources.

Chapter four addresses Texas, especially the Lower Rio Grande Valley. The authors emphasize that South Texas must be understood as a distinct region. Historically part of Nuevo Santander and later Tamaulipas rather than Texas proper, the identity in South Texas has been fluid, shaped by proximity to Mexico and by a demographic majority that remained Mexican well into the twentieth century. For the authors, Jovita Gonzalez's two novels, Caballero and Dew on the Thorn, represent narratives of the transition from a semifeudal rancho system to capitalist commercial agriculture, told from the perspective of landed families facing dispossession. Gonzalez's work, they argue, is notable for foregrounding women's perspectives and for acknowledging debt peonage, yet it also idealizes the ranchero class and presents accommodation to Anglo dominance—particularly through intermarriage—as inevitable. Emma Perez's Forgetting the Alamo, Or, Blood Memory (2009) is singled out as a rare exception in Chicano/a literature for centering Indigenous peoples in its account of 1836 Texas and for presenting mestizo rather than criollo characters. The chapter also treats Americo Paredes's George Washington Gomez (1990) as a bildungsroman tracing the fragmentation of Tejano identity under Americanization, Aristeo Brito's El Diablo en Texas as a novel that superimposes three historical temporalities to show the continuity of dispossession, Rolando Hinojosa's Klail City Death Trip Series as a chronicle of how land became real estate under twentieth-century capitalism, and Carlos Cisneros's The Land Grant (2012) as a legal thriller illustrating how contemporary dispossession operates through the collusion of the legal system, the Church, and narcotrafficking.

Sánchez and Pita connect between the historical enclosures (investigated throughout the book) and contemporary forms of dispossession (e.g. gentrification, eminent domain, environmental destruction, water privatization, the Dakota Access Pipeline). They argue that "enclosures mutate, as it were, taking different forms, and are continually generated within a variety of spaces." The authors also end with readings of two Tomas Rivera stories, "Zoo Island" and "The Salamanders," as texts that register what happens when traditional moorings to land no longer exist and displaced people must construct new forms of belonging and collective identity. While cultural production alone, they believe, cannot produce liberation, it can serve as a catalyst for the critical consciousness necessary for political action: "Real transformation only comes about through political and social action. But in order to catalyze activism, there needs to be awareness, knowledge, and analysis, and cultural production can be generative of this concientizacion."

== Critics ==
According to several reviewers, one of the book's most distinctive contributions is precisely the willingness to implicate Chicano/a literary traditions in the erasure of Indigenous history, a blind spot the authors argue has persisted across generations of Southwest writing.

Erin Murrah-Mandril praised the work as "meticulously researched and beautifully crafted," highlighting its seamless movement between historical and literary analysis and noting that the broad definition of enclosure allowed the authors to connect land loss to gentrification, debt restructuring, and trade agreements. She found the inclusion of Oklahoma an innovative spatial reframing and considered the extended analysis of Mean Spirit the book's most effective section because it allowed the authors to unpack how different types of enclosure layer on top of one another across history. She recommended the book as ideal for graduate or advanced undergraduate courses given its breadth and accessibility.

Doris Morgan Rueda approached the work from a historian's perspective, emphasizing its usefulness as a methodological model for scholars interested in how fiction shapes historical understanding. She found the argument strongest when focused on a single literary work, as in the sustained discussion of Mean Spirit, where the authors "connect the novel to its historical roots and examine how fiction and history dance together, never completely in synch or in step." She concluded that the book demonstrated how "legacies of settler colonialism are not just alive but a part of our daily discourse."

Matt Hinojosa, writing from a history-oriented perspective, described the work as a study of "subject formation through literary production" and acknowledged its rich analysis of shifting cultural identities across the Chicano/a and Native American literary traditions. However, he found the historiography "largely outdated" and argued that the authors' critique of the field did not engage sufficiently with more recent borderlands scholarship that prioritizes Native American agency. He recommended the book for upper-division and graduate Chicano/a studies or literature students, to be read alongside recent works in Chicano/a and Native American history.

Karen Roybal found the book's most significant contribution in its second chapter, which she described as offering "the most in-depth literary and historical analysis of how settler colonial policies affected Native people based on race, gender, social, and legal positions." She considered the authors' claims about elite Nuevomexicano/a and Tejano/a writers as accommodationists to be "accurate, although not nuanced," but credited the work with keenly revealing "contradictions of racialized ideological beliefs and the ways memory can be understood as a site of discursive violence."

Michelle Vasquez Ruiz situated the book within the developing framework of critical Latinx indigeneities scholarship, emphasizing its challenge to decolonial approaches that overlook the material processes of dispossession. She found chapters three and four particularly compelling in their demonstration of how Chicano/a literary works "reflect the complicated trauma produced by the plural temporalities of colonial violence" and how characters can be "both victims and perpetrators of dispossession." She described the work as an important intervention for Latinx studies that confronts "the unsteady relationship between Latinx history and Indigeneity."

William Orchard placed the work within the trajectory of Sanchez and Pita's career-long engagement with nineteenth-century land loss, from Telling Identities through the recovery of María Ruiz de Burton's writings. He valued the concept of enclosure as revealing "the collective scars left by history" and praised the chapters on New Mexico and Texas for showing how writers "negotiated accommodation to the forces overwhelming them." He noted, however, that the book's dismissal of the decolonial as merely epistemic rather than material left it without a clear framework for material intervention, and he suggested that engagement with the emerging field of Critical Latinx Indigeneities would have strengthened the analysis.

Roberto Cantu characterized the book as "a thoroughly researched and detailed account of US history" that restores meaning to terms like criticism, patriotism, and nation. He emphasized the authors' call for Chicano/a historians and novelists to confront the participation of Spaniards and Mexicans in the dispossession of Native American lands, noting their observation that Indigenous peoples enter Chicano/a discourse primarily "in the form of Aztec forefathers of present-day Chicano cultural nationalists." He also highlighted the book's attention to how the Trump era validated the need for broader critical engagement beyond compartmentalized ethnic or gender frameworks.

John Jairo Valencia emphasized the book's resonance with contemporary struggles, drawing connections between its historical analysis and ongoing threats such as the Dakota Access Pipeline and environmental racism in the Amazon. He highlighted the authors' argument that enclosures function as sites perpetuating violence through the logics of capital and territorial power, and he noted the work's potential for educators seeking literary texts to develop lessons on colonization and dispossession. He concluded that the book uplifts the importance of cultural production "to enable new imaginaries that incite transformation."

In a his review and writing from an American Indian studies perspective, Leighton C. Peterson acknowledged the book's "important topic" and "thoughtful array of case studies" but identified significant omissions in its engagement with contemporary Native American studies and critical Native historiography. He observed that the book "never fully resolves the rhetorical tension created between the aim of elucidating Indigenous voices while filtering those voices primarily through non-Native scholars and Chicano/a authors," and he noted that precontact Indigenous histories were presented in a manner that was "succinct, idealized, and superficial." He concluded that the work's primary audience appeared to be Chicano/a scholars rather than specialists in Native American studies, and that its "ultimate achievement is to show the historical and discursive processes that have led to Chicano/a and Tejano/as having displaced Indians as a denigrated caste in the contemporary United States."
