= Rosaura Sánchez =

American writer

Rosaura Sánchez (born December 6, 1941) is a writer, storyteller, linguist and critic. Sánchez' "most singular and significant contribution to this field [Chicano bilingualism] is the formulation of a theoretical framework for the analysis of Chicano Spanish based on the premise that Spanish use in America must be considered in its social and verbal interactions." As an editor, one of her most relevant works was the novel she co-edited with Beatrice Pita, Who Would Have Thought it? (1995) by writer María Amparo Ruiz de Burton of California, published by the Arte Público Press in Houston, Texas.

== Biography ==
Sánchez was born in San Angelo, Texas. She earned undergraduate and master's degrees in Spanish literature from the University of Texas at Austin in 1963 and 1969, respectively. She earned a doctorate in Romance languages from the same university in 1974. Her doctoral dissertation was titled "A Generative Study of Two Spanish Dialects". At one point during her studies, Sánchez joined the Peace Corps and spent several years in Ecuador with the organization.

While a graduate student, Sánchez published "Nuestra circunstancia lingüística," an influential description of rural and urban varieties of Chicano Spanish.

Sánchez was a literature professor at the University of California, San Diego.

== Works ==
As author

- Chicano Discourse: Socio-Historic Perspectives. Arte Publico Press. 1987. ISBN 9781611920925.
- Telling Identities: The Californio Testimonios. University of Minnesota Press. 1995. ISBN 9780816625581.
- He Walked in and Sat Down, and Other Stories. University of New Mexico Press. 2000. ISBN 9780826322135.

As Co-Author (with Beatrice Pita)

Fiction

- Lunar Braceros 2125-2148. National City, Califlas: Calaca Press. 2009-12-22. ISBN 978-0984335909.
- Keep Me Posted: Logins from Tomorrow. Moorpark, CA: Floricanto Press Published. 2023-04-27. ISBN 978-0915745395.

Scholarship

- Spatial and Discursive Violence in the US Southwest. Durham, NC. 2021-04-16. ISBN 9781478021292.

As editor (with Beatrice Pita)

- Ruiz de Burton, Maria Amparo (1995-01-01). Who would have thought it?. Houston, Texas: Arte Publico Press. ISBN 1558850813.
- Ruiz de Burton, Maria Amparo (1997-01-01). The Squatter and the Don. Houston, Texas: Arte Publico Press. ISBN 1558851852.
- Ruiz de Burton, Maria Amparo (2001-01-01). Conflicts of Interest: The Letters of Maria Amparo Ruiz de Burton. Houston, Texas: Arte Publico Press. ISBN 1558853286.
