= Cotera =

Cotera is a surname. Notable people with the surname include:

- Maria Cotera (born 1964) author, researcher, and professor
- Martha P. Cotera (born 1938), Mexican-American librarian, writer, and activist
- Alfredo Cotera (born 1977), Argentine footballer
