= Maria Cotera =

Maria Eugenia Cotera
- Born: July 17, 1964 (age 61); Austin, Texas
- Occupations: Historian, professor
- Employer: University of Texas

Maria Eugenia Cotera (born July 17, 1964) is an American author, researcher, and professor. She is an associate professor at the University of Texas. Her work focuses on the history of women of color, particularly Chicanas and Latinas in the United States. She has published numerous books and scholarly articles, including her most recent book: Fleshing the Archive: An Intimate Genealogy of Chicana Feminist Knowledge Praxis, and is the national director of the Chicana por mi Raza Digital Memory Collective, a digital archive of and oral histories from Chicanas and Latinas in the United States.

== Scholarship ==
María Cotera began her career as a researcher and writer at the Chicana Research and Learning Center, a non-profit dedicated to supporting research by and about women of color. In 1989 she worked on “Crystal City: A Twenty Year Reflection,” a documentary produced in partnership with the CRLC about the role of young women in the 1969 Chicano student walkouts in Crystal City, Texas. After receiving her B.A. in the Plan II Honors Program at the University of Texas, she returned in 1992 for an M.A. in English, where she studied under noted cultural critic, Dr. José Limón. From 1992 to 1994 Cotera worked with Dr. Jose Limón on a recovery project that uncovered a lost manuscript by Tejana folklorist Jovita González. Published in 1996, the manuscript, entitled Caballero: A Historical Novel (Texas A&M Press), includes a critical epilogue by Cotera. She has since published numerous essays on Jovita González and Sioux ethnographer Ella Cara Deloria and has recovered other works by González, including her 1929 Master's Thesis "Social Life in Cameron Starr and Zapata Counties, which was published as Life Along the Border: A Landmark Tejana Thesis(Texas A&M Press). Cotera's first single-author scholarly book, Native Speakers: Ella Deloria, Zora Neale Hurston, Jovita Gonzalez and the Poetics of Culture, received the Gloria Anzaldúa book prize for 2009 from the Women's Studies Association (NWSA), which is awarded for "groundbreaking scholarship in women's studies that makes significant contributions to women of color/transnational scholarship."

After the publication of Native Speakers, Cotera turned her research focus to recovering the legacy of the generation of women who came of age in the political ferment of the Post War years. In 2009 she launched Chicana por mi Raza a digital archive focused on this history with documentary film maker Dr. Linda Garcia Merchant. Since its inception the project has collected hundreds of oral histories and digitally preserved thousands of archival documents in personal collections. With over 30,000 digital assets, it is the largest digital archive of Chicana history in the world. In 2018 she co-edited (with Dr. Dionne Espinoza, and Dr. Maylei Blackwell) Chicana Movidas: New Narratives of Activism and Feminism in the Movement Era (University of Texas Press), a collection of essays and testimonios on Chicana activism in the 1960s and 1970s that has been adopted in university courses across the country. Her most recent publication, Fleshing the Archive: An Intimate Genealogy of Chicana Knowledge Praxis (University of Texas Press, 2026) explores transgressive sites and discourses of Chicana knowledge praxis in the 1970s. Observing the startling convergences between Chicana praxis of the 1970s and digital knowledge production in the present, Cotera argues that the Chicana archive enables transformative moments of recognition across time that unsettle supposedly objective accounts of history.

Cotera has curated several public history exhibits, including Las Rebeldes: Stories of Strength and Struggle in southeast Michigan (2013) and Chicana Fotos: Nancy De Los Santos (2017) and currently serves as an advisor/consultant numerous large-scale digital public humanities projects focusing on the Latinx experience. She has served on the National Council for the American Studies Association (2007-2010), the governing board of the Latina/o Studies Association (2014-2015), the program committee for the National Women’s Studies Association (2017-2018), the Arte Público Recovery Project Governing Board (2018–present), and the ACLS Commission on Fostering and Sustaining Diverse Digital Scholarship (2021-2023).

== Books ==
- José Limón and María Cotera (Eds.), Caballero: An Historical Novel, by Jovita González and Eve Raleigh. College Station, TX: Texas A&M Press, 1996. ISBN 978-0-89096-700-3
- María Cotera (Ed), Life Along the Border: A Landmark Tejana Thesis by Jovita González. College Station, TX: Texas A&M Press, 2006. ISBN 978-1-58544-564-6.
- Native Speakers: Ella Cara Deloria, Zora Neale Hurston, Jovita González and the Poetics of Culture, University of Texas Press, 2008. ISBN 978-0292721616
- Dionne Espinoza, María Cotera, Maylei Blackwell (Eds.) Chicana Movidas: New Narratives of Activism and Feminism in the Movement Era. University of Texas Press, 2018. ISBN 9781477315590
- Fleshing the Archive: An Intimate Genealogy of Chicana Knowledge Praxis. Austin, TX: University of Texas Press, 2026. ISBN 9781477332962
