= Mean Spirit =

1990 novel by Linda Hogan

- First edition
- Author: Linda Hogan
- Original title: Mean Spirit
- Language: English
- Published: Atheneum Books, 1990
- Media type: Print
- Awards: Selected by the Literary Guild
- ISBN: 0804108633

Mean Spirit is a murder mystery based on the Osage murders that took place in Osage Indian Territory in Oklahoma in the 1920s. It is the first novel by Chickasaw author Linda Hogan and was a finalist for the Pulitzer Prize for Fiction in 1991.

== Plot ==
In 1920s Oklahoma, the discovery of oil in the Osage Indian Territory has made the native inhabitants rich. Although slowly, the Osage are not only losing touch with their culture and traditional way of life, but they have also become targets of whites who marry into the tribe. More and more wealthy Osage begin dying of mysterious illnesses or accidents.

The novel focuses on an Osage girl, Nola Blanket, who witnesses her mother's murder by unknown men. Nola is taken in by her cousins, the Greyclouds, who attempt to protect her. As Greycloud family members and other Osage continue dying under suspicious circumstances, justice is elusive. Law enforcement and judicial officials collude to cover up deaths and stymie investigations. Stace Red Hawk, a Lakota Sioux agent with the nascent U.S. Bureau of Investigation comes to Oklahoma to investigate. As the battles between the two worlds mount, Nola and others break away from the greed and start to rediscover their relationship with the land.

== Reception ==
Mean Spirit was selected by the Literary Guild as being "extraordinary...If you take up no other novel this year, or next, this one will suffice to hold, to disturb, to enlighten and to inspire you."

It was nominated for the Pulitzer Prize for Fiction in 1991.

Barbara Kingsolver in the LA Times found it "relentlessly sad" yet full of realistic, complex characters; she praised Hogan: "She's created empathy. She carves a vast tragedy down to a size and shape that will fit into a human heart."

== See also ==
- Killers of the Flower Moon by David Grann
- Solar Storms by Linda Hogan
