= Caballero: A Historical Novel =

1996 historical novel by Jovita González and Eve Raleigh

- Editor: José E. Limón & María Cotera
- Author: Jovita González; Eve Raleigh
- Language: English
- Genre: Drama, novel, historical fiction, romance
- Publisher: Texas A&M University Press
- Publication date: March 1, 1996 (1st edition)
- Publication place: United States
- Pages: 350 (pbk. edition)
- ISBN: 978-0-89096-700-3
- OCLC: 33333314

Caballero: A Historical Novel, often known only as Caballero, is a historical romance novel coauthored by Jovita González and Margaret Eimer (under the pseudonym Eve Raleigh). Written in the 1930s and early 1940s, but not published until 1996, the novel is sometimes called Texas's Gone with the Wind.

The book is set in the vicinity of Matamoros at the time of the Treaty of Guadalupe Hidalgo, in which Mexico ceded its lands north of the Rio Grande to the United States. Its principal character is Don Santiago Mendoza y Soría, a landowner and descendant of the Spanish explorers who first colonized the region, and his family and servants, whose destinies are rewritten by the treaty, the occupation of the region by the American military, and the influx of English-speaking Americans.

Since its rediscovery and publication, Caballero has been branded an important Tejano achievement of national and international relevance and has received much scholarly attention. It is also recognized as an important early piece of Mexican-American literature, in particular for its awareness of the ethnic, gender and class struggles that have characterized Texas history.

== Background ==
When interviewed in the 1970s, Jovita González's husband, E.E. Mireles, acknowledged that their lives and careers in Corpus Christi, Texas, would have been made controversial in the "racial-political climate" in the 1930s and 1940s—had Caballero actually been published at that time.

=== League of Latin American Citizens ===
Caballero was written in a decade marked by heated debate about the Mexican-American's place in United States society. The 1930s saw the birth of the League of United Latin American Citizens (LULAC) and other organizations that promoted the cultural assimilation of peoples of Latin American heritage into mainstream United States culture. Within LULAC, however, there was disagreement about the forms and the extent of this assimilation. Male "Lulackers" typically promoted assimilation in public but sought to maintain patriarchal structures in private. Many females, however, countered this public/private assimilation and advocated for the modernization of gender roles, especially within Mexican-American homes. González was one of the more vocal of these women, and Caballero, which holds at its center a doomed patriarch who refuses to part ways with traditions that subordinate women, can be read as her "warning of what would happen to the ethnic Mexican community if it resisted the democratization of gender roles and ignored the modernization of Mexican American female subjectivity".

=== Texas Centennial (1936) ===
Also contemporaneous with the writing of Caballero was the celebration of the Texas Centennial in 1936. The so-called "centennial discourse" ballyhooed by the media in the 1930s largely extolled the accomplishments of the state's Anglo-American population and, in the words of literary historian John Morán González, depicted Mexicans "as the main obstacle to Anglo-Texan freedom in the past and as a persistent social problem for the state in the present". The "racialized" reconstruction of Texas history prompted the Tejano community to critique their state's marginalization of the Mexican and Mexican-American's contributions. These critiques often took the form of literature written by Mexican-Americans in which they envision "a prominent and honored place in their community within the Lone Star State". Jovita González contested the dominant centennial discourse in her "Catholic Heroines of Texas" poster exhibit at the Texas Centennial Exposition's Catholic Exhibit, an abbreviated version of which she simultaneously published in the Southern Messenger, at about the same time she was beginning work on Caballero.

== Publication ==
The book is famed as much for its place in Mexican-American literary history as for the troubled circumstances surrounding its publication.

=== Failed early attempts ===
Although González and Eimer are both credited as authors, literary historians typically consider González the novel's primary creative force. In 1930, she earned her M.A. in history from the University of Texas at Austin, where she knew and was encouraged to write about her Mexican-American heritage by folklorist J. Frank Dobie. After her graduation, González moved to San Antonio, Texas to teach Spanish. However, in 1934, under Dobie's supervision, she received a one-year fellowship from the Rockefeller Foundation that commissioned her to research and write a book on South Texas history. Caballero and another novel (Dew on the Thorn) seem to have been the result of that fellowship.

González invited Eimer to coauthor the novel around the year 1937. The details of their collaboration are murky, but correspondence exchanged between the two women, and the fact that Eimer's name is listed first on the novel's manuscript, indicate equal involvement. Completed sometime in the early 1940s, the novel was submitted to MacMillan, Houghton-Mifflin and Bobbs-Merrill but was unanimously rejected. Exasperated, Eimer wrote a letter to an acquaintance, saying "[a]ll of these publishers have admitted that the background is interesting, the plot stirring, the characters alive and yet they reject it". The disillusioned coauthors eventually abandoned the project and parted company.

=== Posthumous recovery ===
Margaret Eimer was the co-author for Caballero: A Historical Novel and a close friend to Jovita González. She used the pseudonym Eve Raleigh in her writing, possibly referencing to Eve, the first female, and Raleigh (Sir Walter Raleigh) the English explorer of the Americas. Eimer was a "frustrated but talented writer whose short stories had been rejected by numerous magazines". She had moved to Del Rio, Texas along with her husband "Pop" Eimer from Joplin, Missouri in concurrence with the flow of Anglo settlers moving to Texas during the agricultural boom. In Del Rio, Eimer "developed a warm, even intimate, friendship with Jovita González, a Texas local with Mexican-descent, with whom she shared both a passion for writing and a skeptical stance toward received wisdom about politics, religion, and gender norms". Letters written to González from Eimer expressed her East Coast intellectuality, organized religion, and her opinions regarding societal gender norms, for example, how she persistently refused to marry. González and Eimer collaboratively and interethnically wrote Caballero: A Historical Novel. Although Eimer eventually moved back to Missouri, through the use of the U.S. mail system they continued to work and edit Caballero manuscripts and finish the novel. Common for many other female writers during that time, publishers steadfastly refused to publish the novel and Eimer unfortunately never lived to see the novel published. Eimer died on 27 Oct 1986, however, contrary to previous belief, she died with relatives to claim her belongings, including the original copy of Caballero titled All This is Mine.

González lived in Corpus Christi, Texas, with her husband Edmundo E. Mireles, also a schoolteacher, until her death in 1983. In her lifetime, she never earned acclaim for her novels, but she was nevertheless a prominent Corpus Christi citizen, and she published a couple pieces in the Southwest Review and Publications of the Texas Folklore Society. In the 1970s, González and her husband were interviewed by historian and archivist Martha Cotera for the University of Texas at Austin's Mexican American Library Project Cotera asked about González's 1934 Rockefeller grant and the novel that had resulted. Mireles said then that the Caballero manuscript had been destroyed; however, González indicated with a brief wave of her hand that her husband's statement was untrue.

The Caballero manuscript remained unrecovered until after Mireles's death in 1986. In 1992, the Jovita González and Edmundo E. Mireles papers were archived at the Texas A&M University at Corpus Christi library. Amongst these papers was the manuscript, more than five-hundred yellowed pages in length, bound with twine. A year after its archival, it was identified by University of Texas at Austin Professor José E. Limón who, with María Eugenia Cotera (daughter of the Martha Cotera who interviewed González three decades earlier), edited the novel for publication.

In 1996, Caballero was published for the first time, by the Texas A&M University Press.

== Plot summary ==
The novel consists of a foreword and thirty-six chapters. In chronological sequence, it interweaves both historical and fictional events that occurred near or in other ways impacted the Mexico–United States border in the late 1840s.

The foreword establishes the history of the Mendoza family's presence in Texas. This commences in 1748, when Don José Ramón de Mendoza y Robles, a Spanish explorer, receives permission from the viceroy in Mexico City to lead an expedition of wealthy landowners to the land between the Rio Grande and Nueces rivers. The land he claims for himself he names the Rancho La Palma de Cristo. Soon after, he marries the blonde and green-eyed Susanita Ulloa, who is his junior by many years, and they have one son who survives childhood, named Francisco. Francisco marries Amalia Soría, who bears him three children—Santiago, Dolores and Ramón—before she dies. Santiago, Dolores and Ramón are raised by their grandmother, Susanita, who instills in them their grandfather's greatness and the importance of upholding one's Catholic faith. Susanita, Francisco and Ramón have all died before the novel's proper beginning, leaving the Rancho La Palma completely under Don Santiago's care.

Chapter One introduces us to Don Santiago, the uncontested patriarch of Rancho La Palma, and his family. He, like his father and grandfather before him, has also married a pureblooded Spanish woman, Doña María Petronilla, who is characterized by her simple and unprepossessing dresses. They have four children, all of whom are in their teenage years. Two of these are sons—Alvaro and Luis Gonzaga—and two are daughters—María de los Ángeles and Susanita. Susanita, like the grandmother whose name she shares, is blonde and green-eyed. She is described as Don Santiago's "dearest" child and as he watches her join the family for dinner, he glumly acknowledges that time has come to find her a husband.

Dinner is interrupted by Don Gabriel del Lago, a friend of Don Santiago's and a neighboring Spanish-Mexican landowner, who brings news that Texas has been taken from Mexico by the Americans, and that American soldiers under the leadership of Zachary Taylor have infiltrated the territory and are busy establishing defensive outposts. Each of the characters responds to this turn of events differently: Don Santiago scoffs, refusing to consider Americans any threat to his way of life; Alvaro wants to know what military action can be undertaken to stave off the American forces; Luis Gonzaga contemplates whether or not Americans really are the uncultured hoodlums he has heard them to be; María de los Ángeles, under the assumption that Americans are not Catholic, assumes the invasion is punishment from God for Mexico's sins; and Susanita wonders what it would be like to dance with a tall white-skinned man.

The narrative that unfolds tracks these characters, and others, as their suspicions about the invading forces are explored—sometimes confirmed, but more often reformed. A partial text version of Caballero is available at Google Books.

== Significance of title ==
Initially González and Raleigh planned to name their manuscript All This Is Mine—certainly an ironic title for a coauthored text. The title Caballero (which in English can be translated as "gentleman") refers to more than just the aristocratic Don Santiago who stands at the novel's center. It emphasizes masculinity and makes apparent the authors' "gendered critique of the possessive individuality of the autonomous (male) subject in resistance". María Eugenia Cotera moreover reads the title as containing an "ironic reversal", for although "its gendered singularity gestures to the conventions of heroic narratives, the novel itself denies readers the heroic figure that would normally stand at the center of such narratives". Other critics have read Caballero as an ironic take on the genre of historical romance, and their elucidations often hinge upon the novel's title.

== Main characters ==
=== Mendoza family ===
- Don Santiago - the titular caballero; grandson of Don José Ramón de Mendoza y Robles; patriarch over Rancho La Palma; characterized by his short temper, his insistence that Spanish customs remain upheld, and his hatred for the incoming Anglo-Americans.
- Doña María Petronilla - Don Santiago's wife; perceived as obedient to a fault; gradually begins to resist her husband's domination.
- Alvaro - the elder son; Don Santiago's favored boy; like his father, characterized as haughty and extremely masculine.
- Luis Gonzaga - the younger son; favored by his mother; a talented and aspiring artist; perceived as unmanly by Don Santiago.
- María de los Angeles (Angela) - the elder daughter; extremely penitent Catholic; would like to join a convent but is forbidden by Don Santiago.
- Susanita - the youngest child; obedient; known for her beauty, her blonde hair and green eyes; one-half of the novel's primary romance.
- Doña Dolores - Don Santiago's widowed sister; has a wart on her face that changes colors to match her mood; characterized by her love for beautiful dresses and social functions; quarrels regularly with Don Santiago.

=== Mendoza household (peons, etc.) ===
- Paz - housekeeper, cook and nurse; has worked for the Mendoza family since Don Santiago's youth; uneducated.
- Manuel - Paz's great-grandson; trouble-maker; befriends the American soldiers stationed near Matamoros.
- Tomás - overseer of Rancho La Palma; has worked for the Mendoza family for many years; is lashed by Don Santiago for insubordination.
- José & Tecla - peons in charge of the sheep headquarters; befriend "Red" McLane after he delivers their baby, Alfredo.

=== Other characters ===
- Robert Davis Warrener - suitor to Susanita; American soldier stationed near Matamoros; enlisted to avoid the marriage his southern aristocratic parents had arranged for him; is an excellent singer; woos Susanita with late-night serenades and love letters.
- Alfred ("Red") McLane - suitor to María de los Ángeles; distinguished by his imposing frame and red hair; speaks perfect Spanish; an opportunist who believes helping Spanish-Mexicans adjust to the new American citizenship will prove politically lucrative to him.
- Captain Devlin - army doctor; widower; makes waves by being the first Anglo-American to regularly attend Catholic mass in Matamoros; befriends Luis Gonzaga, with whom he shares an interest in artwork.
- Padre Pierre - Catholic priest; French; facilitates the peaceful relationships between Luis Gonzaga and Devlin, and Susanita and Warrener.
- Gabriel del Lago - another Spanish-Mexican landowner of Don Santiago's generation; suitor to Susanita and (later) to Doña Dolores.
- Inez Sánchez - red-haired and feisty; friend to Susanita; courted unsuccessfully by Alvaro; intermarries with an Anglo-American soldier.
- General Antonio Canales - leader of the Republic of the Rio Grande rebellion; recruits Alvaro and other youths for his guerrillas.

== Major themes ==
=== Female subjectivity ===
Because of Jovita González's established advocacy for a cultural assimilation that included the modernization of gender roles in the Mexican-American community, and because Caballero is a thinly veiled critique of traditional patriarchal home organizations, the novel has since its rediscovery been analyzed as a feminist text. Editors José E. Limón and María Cotera decided for this reason to dedicate the book to "the mexicanas of Texas". They defend their dedication in the "Editor's Acknowledgements": "Caballero deals centrally with the historical experience of Mexican women in Texas, so we think it wholly appropriate to dedicate this book to this often-neglected sector of Texas society". Cotera considers the novel a precursor to the later-century work done by chicana feminists like Ana Castillo, Cherríe Moraga and Gloria Anzaldúa.

Accordingly, many scholars have sought to elucidate the methods and limits of Caballero's critique of patriarchal power structures. For example, in his 2009 book Border Renaissance: The Texas Centennial and the Emergence of Mexican American Literature, John Morán González places Caballero within the context of the ongoing debate over the modernization of gender roles in Mexican-American families. The novel, which he calls the "capstone to literary works by women Lulackers during the 1930s", summarizes the feminist concerns about the "gendered Mexican American subject"—within the scope of an entertaining and ambitious historical novel.

=== Interethnic collaboration ===
The debate over cultural assimilation versus cultural separatism that split Mexican-American thinkers in the 1930s and 1940s continues to surface today in discussions about Caballero. Particular attention has been paid to the fact of the novel's coauthorship between women of distinct ethnic backgrounds, making it "a product of at least two separate and possibly conflictual historical consciousnesses". Critics have indicted the novel's attitude of assimilation; the book does, after all, feature three interethnic couplings between Don Santiago's surviving children and invading American soldiers. María Eugenia Cotera also isolates "what might be a too-celebratory representation of Anglo American values".

In her book Native Speakers, Cotera argues that the significance of the co-authorship of this novel has often been ignored, under analyzed, and wrongly criticized. The novel has been criticized and rejected by both Chicana/o scholars and historically white publishers because of the unique collaboration between González and Eimer. This played a significant role in the failure of getting Caballero published during their lifetimes. González was extremely frustrated by this during her life. There has, however, been a strong counterargument to these rejections that considers the power of these two women from such different backgrounds speaking out together against "the singularity of patriarchal thinking and its bankrupt formulations of identity and authority". Another fascinating component of this collaboration is that it simultaneously tells the Mexican side of the war and reflects a partnership between a Mexican-American and Anglo-American author. Cotera argues that it is only natural for these women to work together as "the notion of a singular author is a construct of modernity that is inextricably linked ‘to the development of modern capitalism and of intellectual property, to Western rationalism, and to patriarchy’". Caballero works to undo this discourse through collaboration as when you write together "you have to desire the collaborative world under formation more than the unextended ‘yours’ and ‘mine’ of the old power structures". This collaboration is not however, to be confused with assimilation or "selling out". The romance plots in the novel have been perceived as assimilationist as if the Anglo men are conquering the Mexican women. However, as Cotera notes, "such criticisms are founded, of course, on the exigencies of race and nation, forcing what is essentially a critique of patriarchal ideology into service as a critique of imperialism, a service that the novel only imperfectly satisfies". Instead of viewing the collaboration as a "sell out" or a problem, it can be viewed as a nepantla, a term the highly acclaimed and respected Chicana scholar Gloria Anzaldúa uses based on a Nahuatl word that refers to "a space between or a middle ground". This concept favors the recognition of the humanity in others and ourselves in order to create bridges and overcome borders. This works on multiple levels, "collapsing ‘the binaries of colored/white, female/male, mind/body," all of which are relevant to Caballero and the historical context of the novel. Eimer and Gonzalez took a leap of faith in one another in both their friendship and their work, as "Caballero's collaborations across difference take place against a historical and geographical backdrop that highlights the risks that such a crossing entail a U.S.–Mexico borderlands still in formation in 1846–1848…". It cannot be stressed enough that beyond the Mexican/Anglo leap of faith taken, the text works with many layers of collaboration on the "path of conocimiento". Caballero's structure of genres is "part history, part tragedy, part romance, part feminist tract," and "its multivalent strategies of description reflect the very complexity of the historical transformations that it seeks to document. In conclusion, in direct contrast to the common critiques and ignorance of the co-authorship of Caballero, the novel itself is "a collaborative text about collaboration, a text that self-consciously enacts the politics of its production within its pages. But it is also a utopian project, a bid to craft a world that was scarcely imaginable in the Texas of the 1930s".

=== Other themes ===
In just over a decade since its publication, Caballero has been analyzed under a number of other critical lenses. Two recent examples include Marci R. McMahon's 2007 essay, "Politicizing Spanish-Mexican Domesticity, Redefining Fronteras", which interprets González and Raleigh's invocation of "the domestic sphere as a site of both negotiation and resistance to U.S. imperialism and colonialism"; and Pablo Ramirez's 2009 essay, "Resignifying Preservation: A Borderlands Response to American Eugenics in Jovita González and Eve Raleigh's Caballero", which analyzes the authors' romantic plots as a response to eugenic claims that "Americanness" was a matter of strong blood lines and deliberate breeding.

=== Race and gender ===
This novel deals with the issue of racism on a level beyond a white/other dichotomy. Race relations in the novel are complicated by the favoring of Spanish blood within the ethnic category of "Mexican." This is demonstrated in the multiple references to Spanish features as the beauty ideals within the Mexican communities. Another demonstration of this favoring is evident in the marriage relations and rules, as Mexicans of indigenous blood or features were not allowed into the marriage structures of those with more direct Spanish lineage and were bound to roles as "peons." While this racist structure existed within the hacienda community, there was simultaneously a land conflict between Native American Indians, Mexicans, and Anglo Americans, as referenced in historical context. This caused a lot of bitter feelings, as witnessed in the derogatory use of the word "gringo" and the fear of Indian Americans. The historical context of the U.S./Mexican War] is a continuous theme throughout the entire novel, and is represented often through the gender expressions of the characters. The women come to represent peace and life while the heterosexual men represent fighting and war. This speaks volumes to the strict gender roles of this culture and time period, in which femininity and masculinity are defined in these classic terms. Don Santiago is also seen as the ultimate patriarch, an identity that ultimately does not serve him well.

== Literary significance and reception ==
The 1990s witnessed an immense expansion in canonical Mexican-American literary texts. Like Caballero, many of these had just recently been "recovered" and made available for wide consumption for the first time. In their introduction to the book, co-editors José E. Limón and María (Eugenia) Cotera anticipate the role Caballero would play in this enlargement of the canon, calling it "a work that speaks centrally to the Texas experience" that deals centrally with the "oft-neglected" experience of Mexican-American women. Accordingly, González and Raleigh's critique of patriarchal traditions won the book its supporters, who celebrated Caballero as the formerly "lost jewel in Chicana literature".

However, the praise, and in particular the labeling of the book as a Chicana/o text, has not been uncontested. Problematic especially to literary scholars who identify as Chicanos has been the fact that Caballero is coauthored—by a Mexican-American woman in partnership with an Anglo-American woman—thus calling into question the text's authenticity. Critics have also been troubled by González's own aristocratic heritage and her association with J. Frank Dobie, whose "paternalist attitude" toward heritage Mexicans is much maligned. In her defense of the novel, Cotera acknowledges that the "politics of its production" complicate our ability to classify it as either a "Chicana/o" or "feminist" text, but that it nevertheless warrants study. In similar fashion, literary historian Andrea R. Purdy writes: "Regardless of her motives, [González's] choices provide an interesting forum for further discussion and analysis". That discussion is carried out today in classrooms and literary journals.

== Bibliography ==
- Cotera, María Eugenia. "Hombres Necios: A Critical Epilogue". Caballero. College Station, Texas: Texas A&M University Press, 1996. pp. 339–350.
- Cotera, M. E. (2008). Feminism on the Border: Caballero and the Poetics of Collaboration. In Native Speakers: Ella Deloria, Zora Neal Hurston, Jovita González, and the Poetics of Culture (pp. 199–224). Austin, Texas: University of Texas Press.
- Cotera, María Eugenia. "Recovering "Our" History: Caballero and the Gendered Politics of Form." Aztlán: A Journal of Chicano Studies 32:2 (Fall 2007). pp. 157–171.
- González, Jovita, and Eve Raleigh. Caballero. College Station, Texas: Texas A&M University Press, 1996.
- González, John Morán. Border Renaissance: The Texas Centennial and the Emergence of Mexican American Literature. Austin, Texas: University of Texas Press, 2009.
- Kreneck, Thomas H. Foreword. Caballero. By Jovita González and Eve Raleigh. College Station, Texas: Texas A&M University Press, 1996.
- Limón, José E. Introduction. Caballero. By Jovita González and Eve Raleigh. College Station, Texas: Texas A&M University Press, 1996.
- McMahon, Marci R. "Politicizing Spanish-Mexican Domesticity, Redefining Fronteras: Jovita Gonzalez's Caballero and Cleofas Jaramillo's Romance of a Little Village Girl". Frontiers 28:1–2 (2007). pp. 232–259.
- Purdy, Andrea R. "Jovita González de Mireles (1908–1983)". American Women Writers, 1900–1945: A Bio-bibliographical Critical Sourcebook. Ed. Laurie Champion. Westport, Connecticut: Greenwood Press, 2000. pp. 142–146.
- Ramirez, Pablo. "Resignifying Preservation: A Borderlands Response to American Eugenics in Jovita González and Eve Raleigh's Caballero". Canadian Review of American Studies 39:1 (2009). 21-39.
- Saad, Saka. "Caballero: A Historical Novel: Jovita González & Eve Raleigh". The Hispanic Review in Higher Education 12:7 (July 2001).

== External resources ==
- Partial text of Caballero: A Historical Novel at Google Books.
- Texas A&M University Press: Caballero: A Historical Novel.
- The Jovita González Papers. Archived in the Wittliff Collections at Texas State University at San Marcos.
- Partial text of Jovita Gonzalez's Dew on the Thorn at Google Books.
- Partial text of Jovita's Gonzalez's Life along the Border: A Landmark Tejana Thesis at Google Books.
- Limón, José. "Folklore, Gendered Repression, and Cultural Critique: The Case of Jovita González" – via Questia.
- José Limón's Professional Website at the University of Texas at Austin.
- María Cotera's Professional Website at the University of Michigan at Ann Arbor.
- Latinoteca: The World of Latino Culture and Arts.
- Hispanic Review. Published quarterly by the University of Pennsylvania (Department of Romance Languages).
- H-Texas (Life & Culture in Texas list-serv) at h-Net.org.
- H-Borderlands (list-serv) at h-Net.org.
