= Who Would Have Thought It? =

1872 novel

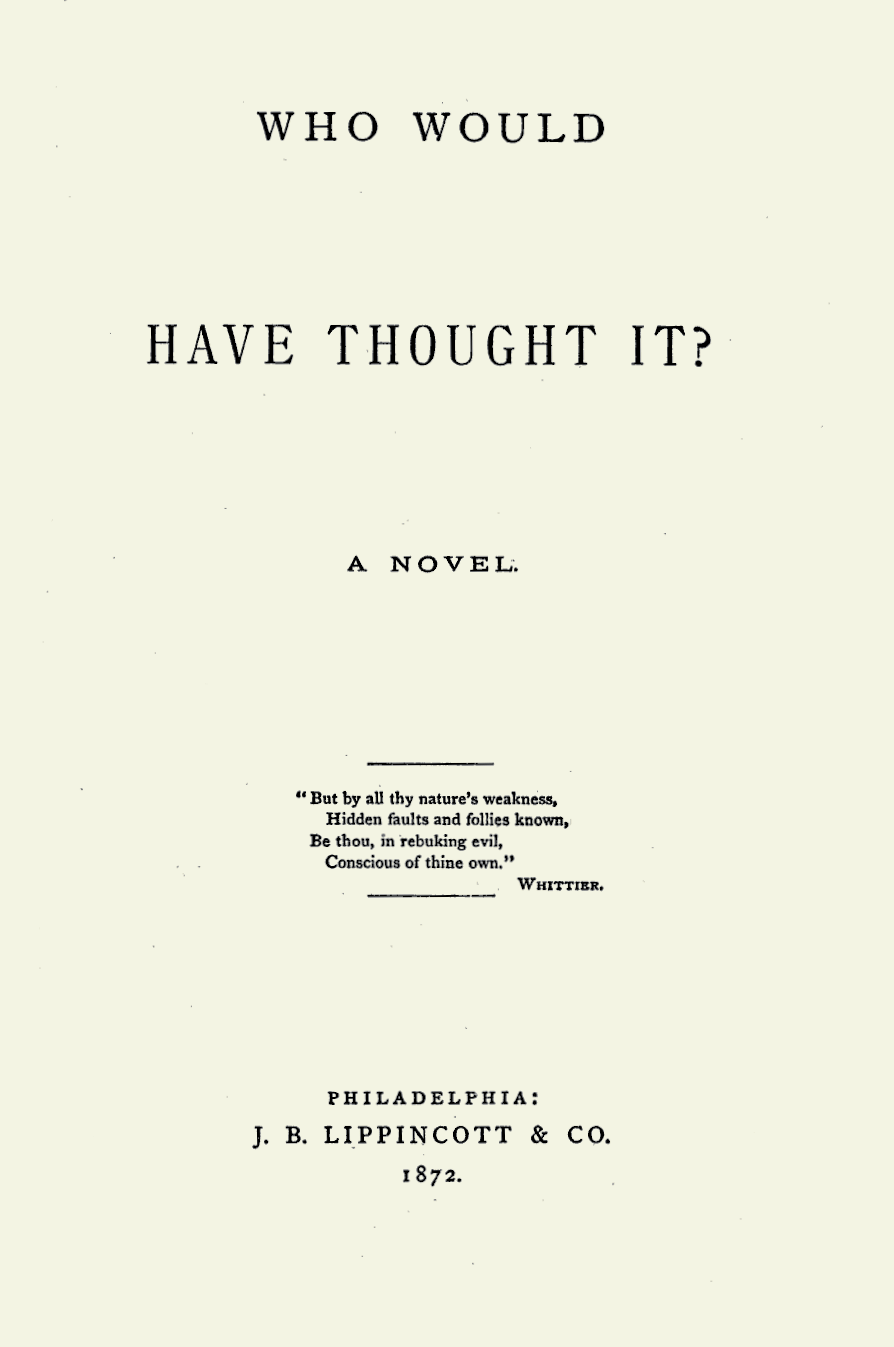
- First edition title page
- Author: María Ruiz de Burton
- Language: English
- Publisher: J. B. Lippincott & Co.
- Publication date: 1872
- Publication place: United States
- Media type: Print
- Pages: 298 pp

Who Would Have Thought It? (1872) is a semi-autobiographical novel written by María Ruiz de Burton. After a long period in which Ruiz de Burton's work was almost completely unknown, the novel was rediscovered by critics interested in the history of Mexican-American literature, and republished to acclaim in 1995. Yet Ruiz de Burton's life was not particularly typical of the Mexican-American experience, as she married a prominent US officer, Captain Henry S. Burton, in the aftermath of the Mexican–American War and became acquainted with many powerful people in Washington D.C. The novel reflects her ambiguous position between the small in number Californio elite and the Anglo-American populace, which formed the majority of the United States population.

It details the struggles of a Mexican-American girl born in Indian captivity, Lola, in an American society obsessed with class, religion, race and gender. The first ten chapters follow the central family in the years leading up to the start of the American Civil War and the attack on Fort Sumter (1857–1861), and flashbacks are meant to take the readers back further than that time line, such as the kidnapping of Lola's mother (1846). The last fifty chapters chronicle the events that took place during the Civil War (1861–1864). Each chapter focuses on a particular character and is told from an omniscient point of view.

== Background ==
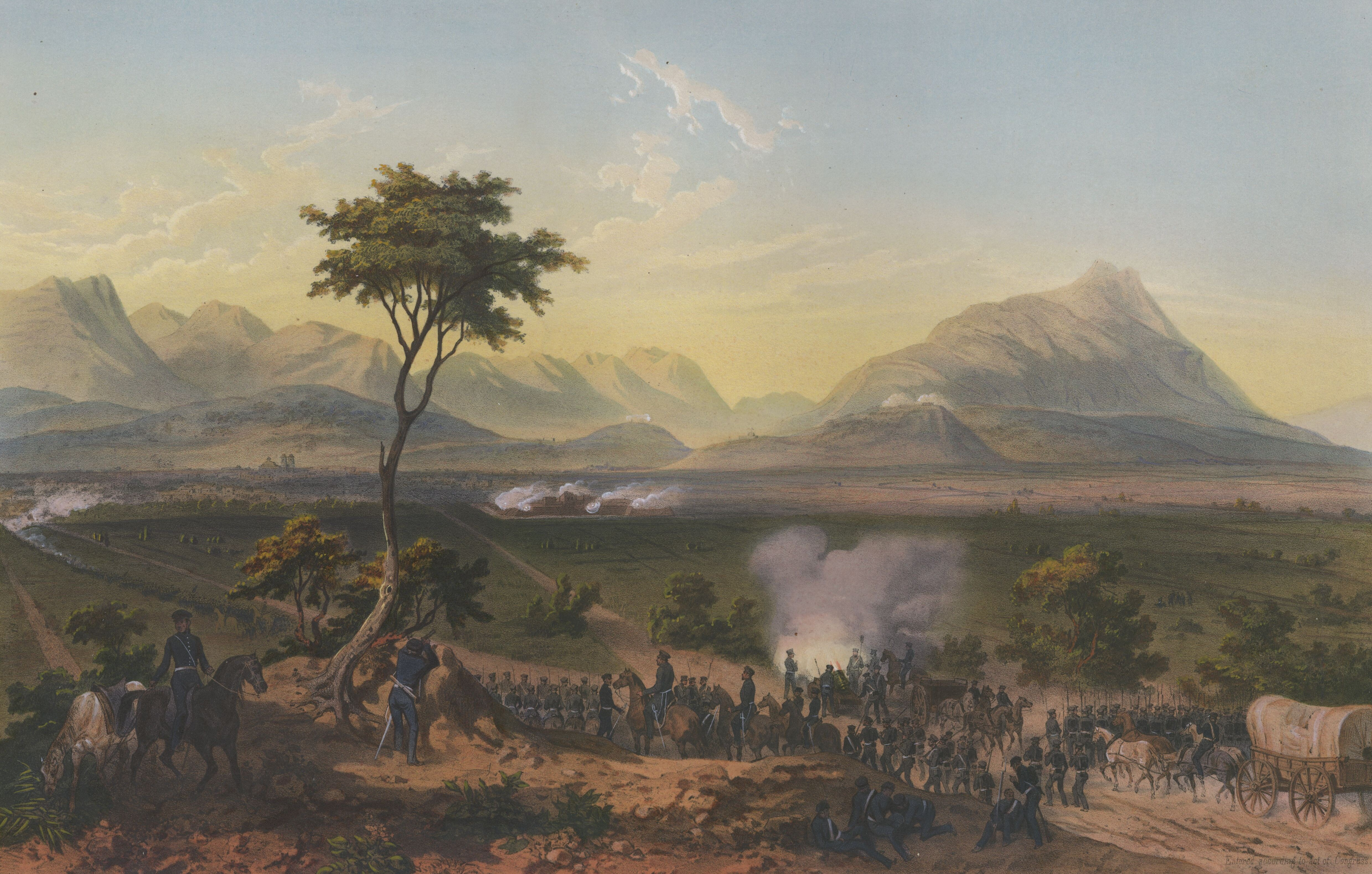
United States troops marching on Monterrey during the Mexican–American War (Carl Nebel, 1851)

María Ruiz de Burton was a native of the Mexican state of Baja California. During the Mexican–American War, Ruiz de Burton witnessed the American invasion of La Paz that began in 1846. In 1847, she met an American military officer, Colonel Henry S. Burton, in Baja. He had been ordered to invade La Paz to suppress a Mexican uprising where the Mexicans there gave little resistance.

When the war ended two years later, California was split into two; Baja California remained Mexican territory while Alta California became American territory. During the American Civil War, Burton served the Union Army. The two were married in 1849, a year after the Treaty of Guadalupe Hidalgo was signed. They lived in the newly claimed American territory and later moved to the East Coast, where Ruiz de Burton observed the economic, social and political turmoil wrought by the war and its aftermath.

Despite living in Eastern cities for a decade, as a Latin-American Catholic, Ruiz de Burton was considered an outsider in Union territory. She transformed her experiences living along the predominantly Protestant Eastern Coast, where Irish Catholics were poorly paid and discriminated against, into the novel Who Would Have Thought It?. The book was published anonymously in 1872; Ruiz de Burton feared that if it became known that a non-native English speaker had written the work that it would undergo greater scrutiny for grammatical errors.

== Plot summary ==
The novel, written in chronological order, is divided into sixty chapters. The first ten occur during the years just before the Civil War (1857–1861), and flashbacks explain the way in which a fabulously wealthy Spanish Mexican named Lola came to stay with a New England family, the Norvals. The last fifty chapters occur during the Civil War (1861–1864).

The novel opens with Dr. Norval's return to New England from a geological expedition in the Southwest, accompanied by a ten-year-old girl, Maria Dolores Medina, known as Lola or Lolita, and trunks of supposed geological specimens that are actually filled with Lola's gold. He was appointed her guardian when he and his companions, Mr. Lebrun and Mr. Sinclair, rescued her from captivity. Because her skin was dyed black by her Native American captors, her arrival generates ironic disgust among the abolitionist women in the household, especially Mrs. Norval. She is horrified by the idea of Dr. Norval contaminating the racial purity of their home, despite his insistence that Lola is of pure Spanish descent and the dye will fade. Mrs. Norval demands that Lola work in order to pay for expenses; Dr. Norval objects and explains to her how Lola's mother, Doña Theresa Medina, gave him gold and precious gems she acquired while a captive of the Apache to finance Lola's care. Doña Theresa Medina asked him to rescue Lola so that the girl would be brought up as a Catholic. The Presbyterian Mrs. Norval is angered when she hears this but quickly reconciles her emotions when he shows her the trunks filled with Lola's fortune.

The second stage of the book proceeds in the style of a novel of manners but without losing the ironic treatment of the characters. Because of Dr. Norval's careful investment of Lola's gold, the family can live off only a small portion of the interest and still grow wealthy. However, the impending Civil War means that Dr. Norval's political sympathies, even though plainly pro-Union Democrat, made him increasingly demonized. The money he gives to his neighbors and family to raise companies for the Union army mean nothing and he is forced to leave the country. He makes sure to leave a will and careful instructions for the keeping of Lola's gold, however. During the war, de Burton shows the rise of the Cackles, neighbors of the Norvals who become unscrupulous and cowardly Senators and Generals for the Union. At the same time, the Norval men are taken captive or frequently injured in the line of duty. The honest efforts of Julian Norval and his aunt, Lavinia Sprig, to avert disaster or save lives are frequently stymied by the powerful and self-interested Cackles. Their efforts lead them into contact with the Secretary of War Edwin Stanton, who is left all-but-unnamed, and Abraham Lincoln, who is named but lightly caricatured. Lola, now in her late teens, has slowly been revealed as the owner of fantastic wealth. Before she comes of age and full control of her gold, however, the money is in the hands of Mrs. Norval, who plots with the hypocritical, sinful, sexual ex-reverend and duplicitous Major Mr. Hackwell to take it from the young girl. Hackwell contrives to trap Mrs. Norval by taking advantage of her husband's supposed death to secretly marry the supposed widow, despite knowing that her husband is still alive. He also secretly and dishonestly tricks Lola into an unwilling marriage. All this while, Julian Norval and Lola have pledged their love to each other, a love which threatens to take the money out of Hackwell's hands entirely. The machinations of Mrs. Norval and Mr. Hackwell come to a head when Julian returns from the war with news of his father's return, showing that the reports of the Doctor's death had been false.

Mrs. Norval's brother, Issac, accidentally discovers Lola's story without knowing about Lola. He travels to Mexico and meets her father, Don Luis Medina. Upon hearing of his daughter's existence in the United States, Don Luis immediately leaves for New York with Issac, who brings the Don quite accidentally to Lola's residence at the Norval's house just in time to upset Hackwell's plans quite precipitously. As Dr. Norval has written that he is about to cross the Atlantic for New York and Don Luis states his intention to sail south for Cuba with Lola, Hackwell finds his plans about to blow up on him. When Mrs. Norval hears that her husband is about to return to find her in a secret marriage with Hackwell, she shrieks and says "Who would have thought it?" before succumbing to neurosis and brain fever.

Julian Norval tricks Hackwell and spirits Don Luis and Lola away on the Cuban steamer only to later follow them, joining Lola in Mexico, where the two are married.

== Characters ==
=== Lola ===
"[Lola] is only ten years old; but her history is already more romantic than that of half of the heroines of your trashy novels"
— Dr. Norval to Mrs. Norval

Maria Dolores Medina, called Lola or Lolita, motivates the core of the story. Her back story provides the initial impetus for the narrative and introduces its symbolism. After her pregnant mother, Doña Theresa Medina, was captured from a Sonora hacienda, Lola was born in the area around the Colorado River and spent her childhood as a captive of the Apache. Her captors dyed the skin of both Doña Maria and Lola to mimic that of the Apache in order to deter rescue. Lola is nonetheless rescued when she is found by Dr. Norval, who takes her away from Indian territory and agrees to her mother's request that she be raised as a Roman Catholic. Her mother dies from an illness a few days after her rescue. Jesse Alemán sees her situation as symbolic of the 80,000 Mexicans who were "orphaned" in the southwestern U.S. at the end of the Mexican–American War. Julie Ruiz suggests that "[Lola's] escape from Indian captivity in the Southwest symbolizes the cleansing of Mexican national identity from the 'stain' of U.S. imperialism during the Mexican War".

Dr. Norval takes Lola to New England and the dye eventually fades, thus beginning "numerous changes in racial status which overlap and effectively generate her simultaneous acquisition of material wealth and cultural capital." She adapts, yet never really fits in: as she becomes racially accepted, the position of her protectors, the Norvals, in New England culture advances. Although Lola is the rightful heir to the gold and jewels, she never controls her fortune. The Norvals provide her with a comfortable lifestyle, yet deprive her of the luxuries that her fortune has supplied the family; despite being the source of their new wealth, she is never fully accepted by them. As literary scholar John-Michael Rivera argues, this represents the prosperity reaped by the northern U.S. from the Treaty of Guadalupe Hidalgo.

=== Dr. Norval ===
At the beginning of the novel, Dr. Norval is a prominent figure in New England; his influence and financial support provide positions in the Senate for his neighbors the Cackles, among others. During the Civil War, his status diminishes because of his alleged sympathies for the South as a Democrat. María Ruiz de Burton plays on his status as a Democrat several times to play ironically with his pious Republican neighbors' reactions to him. For example, she writes that the town is proud of Mrs. Norval for never giving any money to former slaves trying to free their children, but the town knew the doctor "was the one to give to the poor darkies,"Ruiz de Burton 1995, p. 47 an act that earns him ire despite the dissonance of those characters respective political stances. His influence is shown to diminish since the Cackle brothers ignore his plea to free his brother-in-law Isaac, who has been imprisoned for punching another government official. Later, he is accused of supporting the Secession. These political disputes force him into exile in Egypt, leaving Lola under the care of Mrs. Norval.

As Lola's appointed guardian, Dr. Norval welcomes her into his home as one of his daughters. When he finds out that Mrs. Norval has told Lola to sleep in the maid's chambers, he demands that she give Lola a proper furnished room. While other characters wish to keep Lola for purely financial reasons, Dr. Norval and Julian's motivations are more altruistic. Dr. Norval refuses to accept the half of Lola's immense fortune that her mother had insisted. Instead, he only takes six percent of Lola's inheritance. He and his son Julian are the only characters who do not reflect the self-deception, greed and hypocrisy that the novel criticizes as the American national character.

=== Mrs. Norval ===
Mrs. Norval is Dr. Norval's wife and together they have three children: Julian, Ruth and Mattie. Mrs. Norval and her daughters assume that Lola does not speak English and comment on the colour of her dyed skin in her presence. Their perceptions of race reflect the sentiments of white, abolitionist New England women. Mattie and Ruth represent the younger generation and Mrs. Norval represents the older, republican generation. The two girls examine Lola's features closely. Mattie notes the shape and color of Lola's lips and says that they are different from black people's lips, and Mattie quickly suggests that Lola is either Indian or African. Mrs. Norval dismisses these observations and tells the girls not to touch Lola out of fear of infection. Rivera comments that "when Lola's body cannot be defined according to one racial 'type', the European Americans mark it as an unknown part of a collective." As a self-declared abolitionist, Mrs. Norval's cruelty towards the coloured Lola reflect prejudice and hypocrisy in the nation she represents.

Mrs. Norval compromises her beliefs when she realizes the immensity of Lola's wealth. When she hears the news of her husband's death in Egypt, she enters a clandestine marriage with Mr. Hackwell, yielding to his advances even though she claims to be a chaste woman. The couple spends Lola's wealth extravagantly as Mr. Sinclair, who was entrusted with the bulk of Lola's wealth, sends them a monthly allowance intended for Lola. Mrs. Norval uses it to advance her family's social standing in the hopes of finding wealthier, more suitable matches for her daughters. She therefore embodies the idea of Manifest Destiny. She spends Lola's money as if it were hers, since she believes she belongs to the superior race. Lola's wealth corrupts her until she succumbs to brain fever.

=== Julian ===
Julian is a decorated war hero because of his contributions as a Union officer during the Civil War. However, he finds himself unexpectedly dismissed from the service because of accusations of treason. He is mistaken for his father who has been accused on the basis of rumors brought to the attention of President Lincoln by his cronies who also happen to be Dr. Norval's political enemies. Through Julian's character, the novel exposes the corruption within the government and demonstrates how democracy can degenerate to demagoguery.

His romantic relationship with Lola is significant to the narrative's racial politics.

=== Mr. Hackwell ===
The Rev. Mr. Hackwell is a Protestant minister who uses his religious influence for his own benefit. During one of his sermons, he publicly alludes to Dr. Norval. He knows that Mrs. Norval recognizes his authority, and he capitalizes on this in order to increase his own wealth. His insatiable greed reveals him to be a schemer rather than a man of integrity. In her description of this dissolute minister, Ruiz de Burton parodies New England religious life.

Mr. Hackwell enters a clandestine marriage with the newly widowed Mrs. Norval in order to retain access to Lola's wealth. When the couple open Dr. Norval's will without the presence of the rest of the family and Lola, they realize that Lola will receive an allowance from Mr. Sinclair. Mr. Hackwell calculates the precise amount to afford their luxurious lifestyle without arising suspicion from Mr. Sinclair. He is determined to keep Lola's wealth for himself.

Mr. Hackwell attempts to control members of the Norval family and to serve as a guardian of Lola's wealth. He begins by marrying Mrs. Norval and proceeds to suggest a marriage between his sister, Emma, and Mrs. Norval's son, Julian. The marriage, however, does not happen because Julian is in love with Lola. Mr. Hackwell lusts for both Lola and her inheritance. He tricks her into saying that she is his wife in a sworn statement. He uses this to blackmail Lola; however, it fails. He attempts to abduct her but Lola and Julian outsmart him, and she escapes with her birth father to Mexico.

Mr. Hackwell has been described as adulterous and is assumed to be an allusion to Reverend Henry Ward Beecher, whose adultery charges were widely publicized during the nineteenth century.

=== Lavinia ===
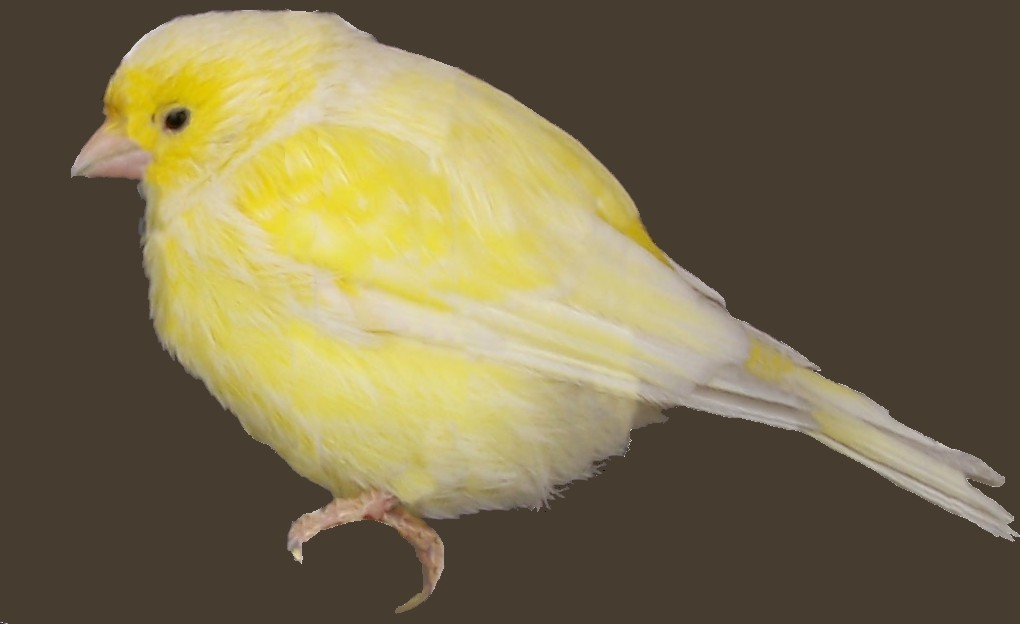
Lavinia, like her canaries, is imprisoned.

Lavinia Sprig was romantically involved with both Mr. Hammerhard and Mr. Hackwell. Despite Lavinia's engagement to Mr. Hackwell, he married another. She remains unmarried and lives with her sister, Mrs. Norval, and the rest of her family at the Norval estate. There, she devotes her time to caring for her canaries. When she decides to leave the domestic sphere and serve as a military nurse during the Civil War, she realizes the responsibility her service entails, and she decides to kill her canaries, thinking that they cannot survive without her. The birds symbolize Lavinia, who ends up being imprisoned in the corrupting influences of American materialism.

As a nurse in a hospital ward, Lavinia speaks to wounded soldiers and prisoners of war in Washington, specifically asking about her brother, Isaac, who was imprisoned for assaulting a fellow government official. She had hoped that they had seen or heard from him while they were in the prison camps. The Washington officials ignore her plea to free Isaac. Lavinia is only able to speak to the president on Isaac's behalf because of the intervention of a man, Dr. Norval's friend, Mr. Sinclair. Lavinia then realizes that her belief in being able to voice her opinions equally with men is unrealistic.

== Genre ==
Who Would Have Thought It? is a historical romance. Writing during the nineteenth century, Ruiz de Burton drew upon the classical tradition and European influence. However, her use of realism and naturalism distinguishes this novel from other historical romances at the time.

== Style ==
=== Irony and satire ===
Ruiz de Burton uses irony and satire to mock American political discourses and practices by ridiculing socio-political structures of the period. Using a variety of rogues, who have pretentious and comical names, Ruiz de Burton represents the vices of nineteenth-century middle-class society. The preachers, Mr. Hackwell and Mr. Hammerhard, the neighbors, the Cackles, and other political figures in Who Would Have Thought It? are unmasked to break down ideological myths of American political rhetoric by contrasting the expectations of the nation with the reality of their actions. American expectations include promoting civil virtue and acting against corruption. However, Mr. Hackwell, the primary religious figure in the novel, schemes to increase his wealth in order to satisfy his ravenous greed. The Cackles clan represents Northern politicians who are only motivated by self-interest. Ruiz de Burton implies that the national practice of self-deception, misrepresentation and secrecy are deeply rooted in the American character, though very rarely revealed. Juxtaposed to this satire of American life are the virtues of the good and beautiful Lola.

=== Allegory and metaphor ===
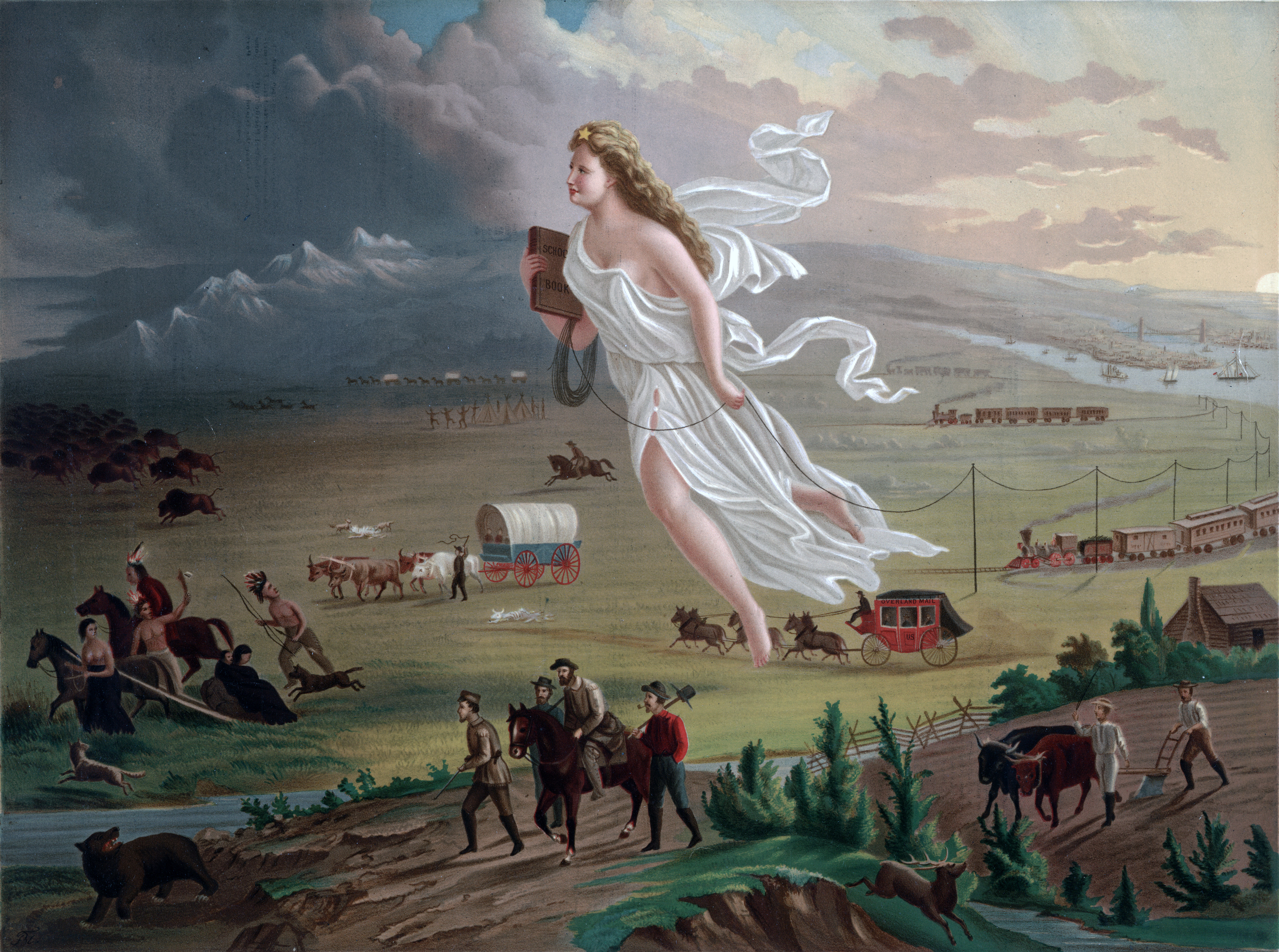
John Gast, American Progress (c. 1872), is an allegorical representation of the version of Manifest Destiny criticized by Ruiz de Burton.

Allegory is used in this novel to expose American exceptionalism as false rhetoric. Ruiz de Burton's characters convey a deeper meaning through their actions to show that the doctrine of Manifest Destiny seems to be built upon hypocrisy, ignorance and, most importantly, greed, instead of the noble aspects articulated by proponents of American expansion. The novel suggests that Manifest Destiny functions as a deceptive maneuver by the United States to conquer lands from other nations. When Mexico had ceded its northern territories to the United States, those who remained in ceded areas received United States citizenship and full rights to property of ownership. However, native land-holding elites of northern California lost a significant portion of their lands overnight, and these lands became a part of the expanding American empire. These native Californians experienced the differences between life before the invasion and life after of "dispossession, and political, cultural and social displacement".

Mrs. Norval is consumed by thoughts of Lola's wealth and, especially after her husband's reported death, she considers that Lola has no just rights to her inheritance. Her pursuit of Lola's fortune is, according to Professor of Postcolonial American Studies Deborah Madsen, an allegory of the American annexation of Mexican land and mineral wealth; hence the novel provides a critique of American imperialism. In addition, Mrs. Norval embodies republican motherhood, a concept of raising children to support the moral beliefs of republicanism. Her position is also a metaphor for the republican nation, in which citizens are expected to uphold civil integrity and to oppose corruption. However, Ruiz de Burton's portrayal of Mrs. Norval's corruption signifies the collapse of the ideology of republicanism.

== Themes ==
=== Race ===
During the nineteenth century, two opposing cultural markers differentiated gente de razon (people of reason) from gente sin razon (people without reason) in Spanish colonial California. Gente de razon were Spanish criollos (white citizens), while gente sin razon were Native Americans (dark-skinned laborers). Doña Theresa wants Lola to grow up as a gente de razon. Doña Theresa insists that she be educated and raised as a Roman Catholic and provides her with an inheritance.

Lola's inheritance is from Doña Theresa's use of natural resources and Indian resources. For example, one day while bathing along the Colorado River, she realized that the pebbles were actually gems. In the hopes of pleasing her, "the Indians brought her emeralds and rubies, seeing that she like pretty pebbles." Doña Theresa's use of Indian labour and resources pertain to the indigenous exploitation during the Spanish colonization.

The paradigm of gracias al sacar suggests that Mexicans and Californios can purchase their "whiteness" from the Spanish crown. In Lola's case, the use of Indian labor allows Lola to symbolically purchase her whiteness from Mr. Sinclair, Dr. Norval's Northern banker. Literary scholar Aleman suggests that Californio colonial mentality is similar to Anglo-American colonialism when it comes to fashioning whiteness by racializing and oppressing Others.

Ruiz de Burton creates a sense of cultural whiteness that is not easily associated with color. Lola's metamorphosis and transition throughout the story reflects racial ambiguity and hybridity. We first encounter her as "the little black girl". However, "[g]oing from black to white, and seen as Indian and Spanish, Lola passes through various stages of racial identity- black, Indian, brown, 'spotted' white, and finally, 'pure' white. Lola's racial ambiguity thus draws on two competing codes: an Anglo American one that defines race as white or black, and a Spanish/Mexican caste system that recognizes multiple levels of hybrid racial identity."

=== Religion ===
Catholicism is introduced to the conservative Protestant Norval home by the arrival of Lola. Doña Theresa Medina's request to raise Lola as a Catholic infuriates the Puritan Mrs. Norval, who describes Catholicism as an "abominable idolatry" and questions the existence of financial support for Lola's Catholic catechism. She places Lola in the servants' quarters, along with the Irish cook and chambermaid. "The narrative must still negotiate the anti-Catholicism of the Protestant Northeast, where the influx of Irish immigrants created a host of alternative Anglo American anxieties regarding 'savagery.'"

Because both Mexico and Ireland were predominantly Catholic, Ruiz de Burton distinguishes Lola as a gente de razon through her refusal to sleep beside the Irish help. One insulted Irishwoman responds: "I am shure I don't want to slape with of the likes of ye." Lola is at a higher social level than the Irishwomen because her ancestry is sange de azul (blue blood), "her mother being of pure Spanish descent and her father the same, though an Austrian by birth, having been born in Vienna." Although the Irishwomen share the same color as the Norval family, they are distanced from the family, particularly when it becomes wealthy through Lola's fortune. Ruiz de Burton showcases the racial, social and economic differences between the various groups of "whites", emphasizing the differences between the Irishwomen and Lola by using religion to distinguish between Mexican Catholics and Irish Catholics.

In addition to Ruiz de Burton's use of religion in the novel, "[she] also Catholicizes this nineteenth-century intolerance stemming from U.S. Puritan origins... [She] takes the nativist stereotypes of Catholicism and aligns them with the barbarous, New World Puritan while separating an Old World Spanish Catholicism from this mixture." The distanced Catholicism is achieved by sending Lola away to a convent for her education. "Ruiz de Burton critiques the convent captivity genres that equated imprisonment within the 'savage' New World Wilderness with captivity to the seductive interiors of the Catholic convent."

=== Gender ===
Conventions of domesticity in the nineteenth century reinforced the idea that women should remain at home to look after the family. Who Would Have Thought It? does not follow the typical romance of domesticity because it introduces women from the domestic sphere into political and public spheres. The novel is situated during a time of modernization in the United States during which the home was transformed. The novel also parodies mid-nineteenth-century family life.

Although Ruiz de Burton has no problems with patriarchal values, she portrays women as smarter, more generous and more action-oriented than they should have been at the time. Her novel critiques the inequality of women, but at the same time she focuses on their sensitivity, morality and beauty. "... Ruiz de Burton also carries out an operation in which she figures male agency as handicap and/or truncates by the forces of decay and corruption... the Norval men likewise suffer 'compromised male agency', an 'emasculation' of sorts, when they are 'absented' from the scene as a result of the machinations of scoundrels – male and female- in collusion with the government and its policies"

== Reception ==
After its publication in 1872, Who Would Have Thought It? remained relatively unnoticed for over one hundred years in American literary studies, demonstrating Ruiz de Burton's exclusion from American literary history and more broadly the marginalized importance that Mexican-Americans had in American history. One of the main reasons that Ruiz de Burton's works were excluded from popular American literature is because of their depiction of American culture and morals as hypocritical. In addition, her interpretation of the loss of Mexico's claim over Northern California demonstrates her discontent with American ideals of the time. After her marriage to an American colonel, her writing widened to accommodate the perspective of being both a "colonizer, and the colonized". Caught between her newfound position in the Californian elite and her background as a Californian native, her novel was not welcomed by American literary studies nor Chicana literary studies.

A cooperative scholarly group called Recovering the United States Hispanic Literary Heritage Project brought Who Would Have Thought It? to public notice in the late twentieth century. This group was created in 1990, and its main goal is to recover literary texts by Hispanic writers and obtain narratives of their lives since the sixteenth century through sources such as memoirs, prose, fiction, poetry and histories. These scholars describe Ruiz de Burton's work "as an object lesson in the complexities and contradictions of resurrecting literary history."
