= Alfredo Cotera =

Argentine footballer

Personal information
- Full name: Alfredo Nicolás Cotera
- Date of birth: 5 November 1977 (age 48)
- Place of birth: Buenos Aires, Argentina
- Height: 1.83 m (6 ft 0 in)
- Position: Defender

Senior career*
Years	Team	Apps	(Gls)
1997–1999	Huracán	16	(0)
1999–2000	Millonarios		
2001	Monza		
2002	Universidad de Concepción		
2003–2004	Szombathelyi Haladás		
2005–2006	Deportivo Español	2	(0)
- * Club domestic league appearances and goals

Alfredo Nicolás Cotera (born 5 November 1977 in Buenos Aires, Argentina) is an Argentine former professional footballer who played as a defender for clubs of Argentina, Chile, Colombia, Italy and Hungary.

== Clubs ==
- Huracán 1997–1999
- Millonarios 1999–2000
- Monza 2001
- Universidad de Concepción 2002
- Szombathelyi Haladás 2003–2004
- Deportivo Español 2005–2006
