= People of the Whale =

2008 novelby Linda Hogan

- First edition cover
- Author: Linda Hogan
- Language: English
- Genre: Novel
- Publisher: W. W. Norton
- Publication date: 2008
- Publication place: United States
- ISBN: 978-0-393-33534-7

People of the Whale is a 2008 novel by Linda Hogan about a Native American man with a supernatural ability to breathe underwater who is forced to come to terms with his experiences in the Vietnam War.

The novel draws on real-world conflicts over indigenous water rights. Hogan based the fictional A'atsika community in the novel on the Makah, who by treaty had been granted rights to hunt whales and seals in the Neah Bay region, but faced opposition from animal rights groups when they resumed hunting in 1999.

== Reception ==
Kirkus Reviews called the novel "portentous and didactic", writing that it "excels, early on, in laying out tribal lore" but that "the abstract, preachy voice palls".
