= Solar Storms (novel) =

1995 novel by Linda Hogan (writer)

Solar Storms is a novel that was written by Linda Hogan and published by Scribner in 1995.
