= Linda Hogan (writer) =

American poet

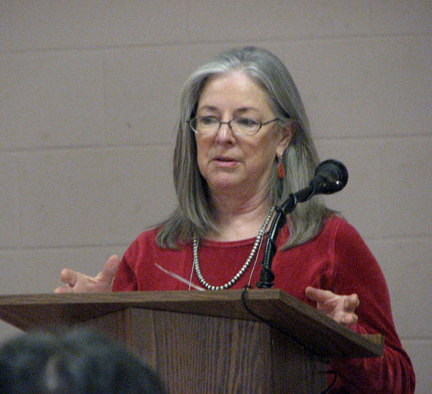
- Hogan in 2007
- Born: Linda K. Henderson; July 16, 1947 (age 79); Denver, Colorado, U.S.
- Education: University of Colorado, Colorado Springs (BA); University of Colorado, Boulder (MA)
- Occupations: Author, professor
- Children: 2
- Writing career
- Years active: 1978–present
- Genre: Poetry
- Website: LindaHoganWriter.com

Linda K. Hogan (née Henderson, born July 16, 1947) is an American poet, storyteller, academic, playwright, novelist, environmentalist and writer of short stories. She previously served as the Chickasaw Nation's writer in residence. Hogan is a recipient of the Lannan Literary Award for Poetry.

== Early life ==
Linda Hogan was born July 16, 1947, in Denver, Colorado. Her father, Charles C. Henderson, is a Chickasaw from a recognized historical family. Her mother, Cleona Florine (Bower) Henderson was of white descent. Linda's uncle, Wesley Henderson, helped form the White Buffalo Council in Denver during the 1950s, to help other Native American people coming to the city because of The Relocation Act, which forcibly removed Indigenous peoples for work and other opportunities.

== Career ==
Hogan earned a Master of Arts (M. A.) degree from the University of Colorado at Boulder in 1978. She was a full professor of Creative Writing at the University of Colorado and then taught for two years in the university's Ethnic Studies Department. She has been a speaker at the United Nations Forum and was a plenary speaker at the Environmental Literature Conference in Turkey in 2009. Her most recent teaching has been as Writer in Residence for The Chickasaw Nation for six years, and a faculty position at the Institute of American Indian Arts in Santa Fe.

Hogan has worked across various genres, such as poetry, novel-length fiction, short fiction, and nature essays. She has also written nonfiction essays for environmental organizations like The Nature Conservancy and the Sierra Club. In 2015, Hogan worked with Brenda Peterson on, Sightings, the Mysterious Journey of the Gray Whale for National Geographic books. She also wrote the script for the PBS documentary, Everything Has a Spirit, regarding Native American religious freedom.

== Personal life ==
Hogan married Pat Hogan (divorced) and has two children.

== Awards and recognition ==
- Five Civilized Tribes Play Writing Award, 1980
- Stand magazine Fiction Award, 1983
- American Book Award, Before Columbus Foundation, 1986
- Finalist, Pulitzer Prize for Fiction, 1991
- Guggenheim Fellow, 1991
- Oklahoma Book Award for Fiction for Mean Spirit, 1991
- Finalist for the National Book Critics Circle Award for The Book of Medicines, 1993
- Colorado Book Award for The Book of Medicines, 1993
- Lannan Award for Outstanding Achievement in Poetry, 1994
- Colorado Book Award for Solar Storms, 1996
- Lifetime Achievement Award, Native Writers' Circle of the Americas, 1998
- Writer of the Year (Creative Prose), Wordcraft Circle Award, 2002
- Inducted into the Chickasaw Hall of Fame, 2007
- Native Arts and Cultures Foundation National Artist Fellowship, 2015
- Thoreau Prize from PEN, 2016

== Published works ==
- Calling Myself Home, Greenfield Review Press, 1978
- A Piece of Moon, 1981
- Daughters, I Love You, Research Center on Women, 1981
- Eclipse, American Indian Studies Center, University of California, 1983, ISBN 978-0-935626-18-6
- Seeing Through the Sun. University of Massachusetts Press. 1985. ISBN 978-0-87023-472-9. "Linda Hogan."
- Savings: Poems. Coffee House Press. 1988. ISBN 978-0-918273-41-3. "Linda Hogan."
- Mean Spirit, Atheneum, 1990, ISBN 978-0-689-12101-2
- Red Clay: Poems and Stories, Greenfield Review Press, 1991, ISBN 978-0-912678-83-2
- The book of medicines: poems, Coffee House Press, 1993, ISBN 978-1-56689-010-6
- Solar Storms. Scribner. 1995. ISBN 978-0-684-81227-4.; Simon and Schuster, 1997, ISBN 978-0-684-82539-7
- Dwellings: A Spiritual History of the Living World. W.W. Norton. 1995. ISBN 978-0-393-03784-5.; Simon and Schuster, 1996, ISBN 978-0-684-83033-9
- Power. W. W. Norton & Company. 1998. ISBN 978-0-393-04636-6.; W. W. Norton & Company, 1999, ISBN 978-0-393-31968-2
- The Sweet Breathing of Plants: Women and the Green World, 2000; North Point Press, 2001, ISBN 978-0-86547-559-5
- The Woman Who Watches Over the World: A Native Memoir. W.W. Norton. 2001. ISBN 978-0-393-05018-9.; W. W. Norton & Company, 2002, ISBN 978-0-393-32305-4
- Rounding the Human Corners: Poems, Coffee House Press, 2008, ISBN 978-1-56689-210-0
- People of the Whale: A Novel; W. W. Norton & Company, 2009, ISBN 978-0-393-33534-7
- The Inner Journey: Views from Native Traditions (ed.) Morning Light Press, 2009, ISBN 978-1-59675-026-5
- Indios, poems, Wings Press, 2012
- Dark, Sweet: New and Selected Poems, Coffee House Press, 2014

== Power ==
Linda Hogan's Power explores the complicated dualities of the lives of Native Americans in the modern world. Her novel focuses on a young Taiga woman, Ohmishto, who has to make a choice between her traditional tribal lifestyle or subscribe to her mother's western Christian ideology when a Taiga relative, Ama, is arrested for killing an endangered animal that is also considered sacred to the tribe. The black panther becomes a symbol in the book as it is connected to themes of colonialism, tribal sovereignty, and connection to the land.

Through themes of colonialism and tribal sovereignty, the book asks questions about who should get to decide laws and whether laws should apply to those who are Native Americans. The American court system approaches the crime through the viewpoint of killing an endangered animal while the Native Americans present see the entire situation in a completely different way. Black panthers are seen as kin to the Taiga people and this discovery makes the lawyers even more perplexed. Additionally, the novel is very interested in ideas of connection to the land, particularly in the extreme differences in how Native American culture and white culture approach land ownership and the animals that live within. While the white people are portrayed as trying to have control over everyone and everything, including the Natives, the Natives are portrayed as trying to live harmoniously with the world around them.

== Criticism ==
- Baria, Amy Greenwood. "Linda Hogan's Two Worlds." Studies in American Indian Literatures, vol. 10, no. 4, 1998. pp. 67-73.
- Dennis, Helen M. Native American Literature: Towards a Spatialized Reading. London, Routledge 2006. pp. 61–85.

== In Anthology ==
- Melissa Tuckey, ed. Ghost Fishing: An Eco-Justice Poetry Anthology. University of Georgia Press, 2018.

== See also ==
- List of writers from peoples indigenous to the Americas
- Native American Renaissance
- Native American Studies
