= Jovita González =

Mexican-American folklorist and writer (1904–1983)

Jovita González (January 18, 1904 – 1983) was a well-respected Mexican-American folklorist, educator, and writer, best known for writing Caballero: A Historical Novel (co-written with Margaret Eimer, pseudonym Eve Raleigh). González was also involved in the commencement in the League of United Latin American Citizens and was the first female and the first Mexican-American to be the president of the Texas Folklore Society from 1930 to 1932. She saw a disconnect between Mexican-Americans and Anglos so in a lot of her work, she promoted Mexican culture and tried to ease the tensions between each group.

== Background and upbringing ==
Jovita González was born near the Texas-Mexico border in Roma, Texas on January 18, 1904, to Jacob González Rodríguez and Severina Guerra Barrera. She was born into an unordinary family. Her father's side was filled with hardworking educated Mexicans: "My father, Jacob González Rodríguez, a native of Cadereyta, Nuevo León, came from a family of educators and artisans." On the other hand, her mother's family were descendants of the Spanish colonizers: "Both my maternal grandparents came from a long line of colonizers who had come with Escandón to El Nuevo Santander." Jovita was the fourth out of her parents' seven children.

In her earliest years spent on her grandparents’ ranch, González heard tales of the people who worked for her grandfather. These stories later became a creative influence upon her work as a folklorist, teacher, and writer. In 1910, when she was just 6 years old, her parents decided to move their family from Roma to San-Antonio so they could receive a better education. This move occurred during the Mexican Revolution when many Mexican immigrants were fleeing their country into areas of Texas. González experienced this large influx of immigrants while living in San Antonio.

== Education ==
After finishing high school, she enrolled in the University of Texas at Austin but she returned home after her freshman year because she did not have the funds to pay for her education. As a result, she spent a couple of years teaching as "a Head Teacher of a two-teacher school." Soon after, she would enroll in Our Lady of the Lake. While she was there, she met J. Frank Dobie, the man that encouraged her to rewrite Mexican folktales that would later be published in his anthology Pure Mexicano as well as the Folklore Publications and the Southwest Review. After graduating from Our Lady of the Lake with a Bachelor of Arts (1927) and teaching at Saint Mary's Hall for a couple of years, she was awarded the Lapham Scholarship to fund her education to get her master's degree from the University of Texas at Austin. In 1930, she wrote her master's thesis on “Social Life in Cameron, Starr, and the Zapata Counties”.

== Social Life in Cameron, Starr, and Zapata Counties ==
She titled her thesis for her master's degree Social Life in Cameron, Starr, and Zapata Counties. The main focus of her thesis was to bridge the gap between the Anglos and the Texas-Mexicans. In the summer of 1929, Gonzaléz spent her time traveling through "the remotest regions of Webb, Zapata, and Starr Counties." A research grant from the Rockefeller Foundation in 1934 allowed her to do so. While she was doing her research, she interviewed Anglos and Texas-Mexicans of all classes so she could see how they viewed each other. Her thesis Master, Dr. Eugene C Barker, did not want to approve of her work at first. He claimed that it did not have enough historical references and was "an interesting but somewhat odd piece of work." Dr. Carlos E. Castañeda, a friend of Gonzaléz's, thought that it would be used as source material in the future.

== Organizations and Societies ==
Throughout her undergraduate and graduate education, González was involved in many societies and organizations. She was a part of Junta del Club de Bellas Artes, a middle-class organization of Mexican-descent women, the Newman Club, the Latin American Club, and the Texas Folklore Society.

== Texas Folklore Society ==
With the help of J. Frank Dobie, the Texas Folklore Society turned to "the collection of the folklore of the dispossessed with special attention to the folk traditions of Mexicans in Texas." Through Jovita Gonzaléz's relationship with Dobie, he was able to edit her manuscripts, have deep discussions about Mexican Folklore with her, and promote her "organizational participation in the Texas Folklore Society so that she eventually became its president." She was elected as vice president in 1928 and as president in both 1930 and 1931. Since the society consisted mainly of white male Texans, it was a big deal that Gonzaléz, a Mexican-American woman, was president. Her first of many contributions to the society was to Texas and Southwestern Lore, "a collection of popular folklore from Texas and the Southwest, including ballads, cowboy songs, Native American myths, superstitions and other miscellaneous folk tales." She added tales and songs "of the masculine world of the vaqueros." She would continue to regularly contribute to the Publications of the Texas Folklore Society and present her research at the annual meetings. She had a huge impact on the society and was seen as expert on the culture of Mexican-Americans of the southwest.

== Marriage, published works, and teaching ==
It was at the University of Texas in Austin that González met her husband Edmundo E. Mireles. They were married in 1935 in San Antonio but then moved to Del Rio, Texas where Mireles became the principal of San Felipe High School and she an English teacher and the head of the English department. It was in Del Rio where González met Margaret Eimer, the co-author for her book Caballero: A Historical Novel. In 1939, El Progreso publisher Rodolfo Mirabal recruited Mireles, therefore the married couple relocated to Corpus Christi, Texas where they wrote two sets of books, Mi Libro Español (books 1–3) and El Español Elemental for grade schools. González was involved in the Spanish Institute Mireles founded and the Corpus Christi Spanish Program that promoted Spanish-teaching in public schools. González was involved in the League of United Latin American Citizens (LULAC), a league in which Mireles was actually one of the founders. “She was also active as club sponsor for Los Conquistadores, Los Colonizadores, and Los Pan Americanos”. Her early published works include “Folklore of the Texas-Mexican Vaquero” (1927), “America Invades the Border Town” (1930), “Among My People” (1932), and “With the Coming of the Barbed Wire Came Hunger,” along with other pieces in "Puro Mexicano" with Dobie as an editor. “Latin Americans” was written in 1937 for Our Racial and National Minorities: Their History, Contributions, and Present Problems. González was the first person of Mexican descent to write on the topic.

== Major Works ==
=== Caballero ===
In the late 1930s and throughout the 1940s, González, in collaboration with Margaret Eimer (pseudonym Eve Raleigh), wrote the historical novel Caballero. Caballero is “a historical romance that inscribes and interprets the impact of the US power and culture on the former Mexican northern provinces as they were being politically redefined into the American Southwest in the mid-nineteenth century”. Eimer and González had originally met in Del Rio, Texas, and continued to collaboratively write the novel through mailing the manuscripts after the two relocated to different cities. González spent twelve years compiling information for Caballero from memoirs, family history, and historical sources while conducting research for her master's thesis at the University of Texas. Unfortunately, Caballero was never published within the lifetimes of either Eimer or González. The novel is set during the U.S.-Mexico War, and critiques some aspects of U.S. colonization, but it also critiques the patriarchal structure of the Tejano hacienda system. The narrative centers on the Mendoza y Soria daughters as desiring subjects when they insist on marrying against their father's will. Like González's other works, the novel critiques U.S. historical narratives and modernity itself through an alternative Tejana cultural memory.

=== Among My People ===
"Among my People" was another one of Gonzaléz's contributions to the Texas Folklore Society. The tale was published in J. Frank Dobie's collection Tone the Bell Easy. She divided the tale up into 3 sections where in each, she talks about a Mexican man and religion. In the first section, "Juan, El Loco" (translated in English to "Juan, The Crazy" ), Gonzaléz discusses the mystery of an old ranchero who has witches visit him. The "Don Jose Maria" section is about an affluent man in Río Grande valley that threatens to commit suicide whenever one of his daughters gets married. In "Don Tomas," the last section of the tale, she tells a story of how a ranchero is in search for a pastor after his daughter-in-law used witchcraft to ruin his entire family. The text shows how religion and in particular, witchcraft is viewed in the Mexican culture.

=== The Bullet-Swallower ===
In 1936, she retold the famous folktale The Bullet-Swallower. The tale is about a fearless Mexican man who "left his upper-class environment to face the harshness of the west." By retelling this tale in English with a few Spanish words, González gave English speaking readers the opportunity to understand the Mexican culture as well as see the uniqueness in the narrator of the tale. It was published in Pure Mexicano, J. Frank Dobie's anthology.

== Retirement, attempted autobiography, and death ==
González continued to teach Spanish and Texas History at W.B. Ray High school in Corpus Christi until her retirement in 1967. After her retirement, she attempted to write her autobiography, yet was unsuccessful due to her diabetes and chronic depression, and eventually left the project unfinished as a thirteen-page outline. In 1983, González died of natural causes in Corpus Christi. The Mexican Americans in Texas History Conference, organized by the Texas State Historical Association, honored González in 1991. Her works are currently held at the Nettie Lee Benson Latin American Collection at the University of Texas at Austin and also in the Southwestern Writers Collection at the Texas State University-San Marcos.

== Bibliography ==
- Champion, L., Nelson, E. S., & Purdy, A. R. (2000). Jovita González de Mireles. In American Women Writers, 1900-1945: a bio-biographical critical sourcebook (pp. 142–146). Westport, CT: Greenwood Press.
- Cotera, M. E. (2008). Feminism on the Border: Caballero and the Poetics of Collaboration. In Native Speakers: Ella Deloria, Zora Neal Hurston, Jovita González, and the Poetics of Culture (pp. 199–224). Austin, TX: University of Texas Press.
- Cotera, Maria Eugenia. Introduction to Caballero and Biography on Jovita González. Women's Studies. Angell Hall. 26 October 2009. Lecture.
- González, J., & Raleigh, E. (1996). Caballero: A historical novel. College Station, TX: Texas A&M University Press.
- Jovita González Mireles Papers. (n.d.). The Wittliff Collections. Retrieved from
- Orozco, C. E., & Acosta, T. P. (n.d.). Jovita González de Mireles. The Handbook of Texas Online. Retrieved from http://www.tshaonline.org/handbook/online/articles/fgo34
- The Norton Anthology of Latino Literature, by Ilan Stavans, W.W. Norton & Co., 2011, pp. 524–530.
- Gonzalez, Jovita. Life along the Border. Edited by María Eugenia Cotera, Texas A&M University Press, 2000.
- Mireles Jovita González. Dew on the Thorn. Edited by Limón José Eduardo, Arte Publico Press, 1997.
- Aleman, Melina. “Jovita González.” Oxford Bibliographies, Oxford Bibliographies, 12 June 2017, www.oxfordbibliographies.com/view/document/obo-9780199827251/obo-9780199827251-0006.xml.
- Limón, José E. “Texas Studies in Literature and Language.” Folklore, Gendered Repression, and Cultural Critique: The Case of Jovita Gonzalez, vol. 35, no. 4, 1993, pp. 453–473.
- Dobie, J. Frank (James Frank). “Texas and Southwestern Lore.” The Portal to Texas History, B'Southern Methodist University Press', 1 Jan. 1970, texashistory.unt.edu/ark:/67531/metadc67662/.
- Cotera, María Eugenia. “Jovita González Mireles: Texas Folklorist, Historian, Educator.” Leaders of the Mexican American Generation: Biographical Essays, University Press Of Colorado, 2016, pp. 119–139.
- “Among My People.” Tone the Bell Easy, by Mireles Jovita González, 2nd ed., vol. 17, Southern Methodist University Press, 1932, pp. 179–187.
