= María Ruiz de Burton =

American dramatist (1832–1895)

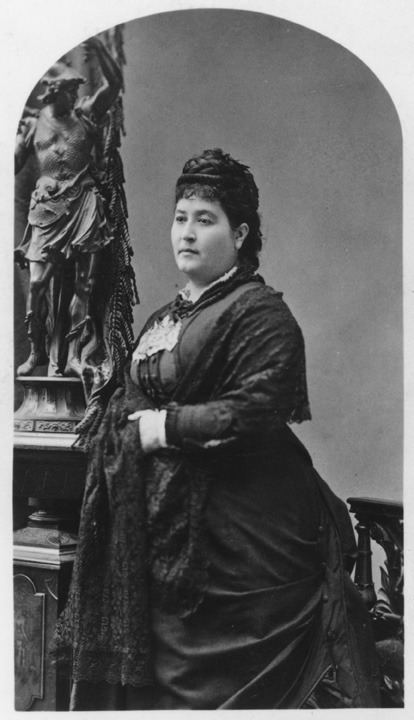
- Born: María Amparo Maytorena Ruiz; July 3, 1832; Loreto, Baja California
- Died: August 12, 1895 (aged 63); Chicago, Illinois
- Resting place: Pioneer Park (San Diego); 32.7492°N 117.1776°W
- Citizenship: American
- Occupations: Writer, political instigator
- Spouse: Henry S. Burton

María Amparo Ruiz de Burton (July 3, 1832 – August 12, 1895) was a Californio author and intellectual, best known as the first female Mexican-American writer to be published in English. During her career, she published two books: Who Would Have Thought It? (1872) and The Squatter and the Don (1885); and one play: Don Quixote de la Mancha: A Comedy in Five Acts: Taken From Cervantes' Novel of That Name (1876).

Ruiz de Burton's work is considered to be one of the first instances of Mexican-American literature, and gives the perspective of the conquered Mexican population that, despite being granted full rights of citizenship by the Treaty of Guadalupe Hidalgo, was a marginalized national minority. Her background provided her a critical distance from the New England Protestant culture into which she was brought by her marriage to her husband, a powerful and influential Protestant Union Army General, Henry S. Burton. Her life took her from coast to coast in the United States, which provided her with opportunity for first-hand observation of the U.S., its westward expansion, the American Civil War, and its aftermath. This vantage point and her status as a woman provided her with both an insider's and outsider's perspective on issues of ethnicity, power, gender, class, and race.

== Early life ==
=== Family ===
María Amparo Ruiz de Burton was born on July 3, 1832, in Loreto, Baja California. Her grandfather, Jose Manuel Ruiz, commanded the Mexican troops along the northern frontier in Baja California and served as governor of the region from 1822 until 1825. For his services, he was granted over 3,500 hectares of land in the Ensenada region. His brother, Francisco Ruiz, was commandate of the Presidio of San Diego. Her parents were Jesús Maitorena and Isabel Ruiz Maitorena. She had two siblings, Manuela and Federico Maitorena. She kept her mother's maiden name, which signified her prominent social standing. She lived a privileged life as a member of the elite. Ruiz de Burton came of age during the Mexican-American War. When she was fifteen, she witnessed the surrender of her hometown, La Paz, to American forces. She soon met her future husband, Captain Henry S. Burton, the commander of the First Regiment of New York Volunteers, who had participated in the capture. As the war drew to a close, it appeared that Baja California would remain a Mexican state, while Alta California would become territory of the United States. Burton offered to help residents of Baja California move to Alta California and become United States citizens. Soon after the Treaty of Guadalupe Hidalgo was signed in 1848, Ruiz de Burton, her mother, and her brother moved to Monterey and became American citizens.

=== Education ===
Little is known about her education except that she was schooled in Spanish and French, then later in English. Her work suggests a background in the classics, English, Spanish, and American literature, and in European and American history.

== Marriage ==
Marriages between Californios and prominent American soldiers were rare. Among Californios, Maria Amparo Ruiz de Burton could be considered a traitor for embracing a man who had led an invasion of her country. Theirs was a union of ‘natural enemies’ given their differences in religion, nationality, and age, during wartime. While the marriage did not bring Ruiz de Burton any specific power or property, it did offer a new social status and opportunities that were previously out of reach to her as a Mexican woman. As Rosaura Sanchez and Beatrice Pita see it, "While birth gave María Ruíz de Burton a sense of family, regional, and national identity, migration and marriage determined citizenship, social status, and access to a variety of social strategies in the United States" Although Ruíz de Burton was not shy to take full advantage of these insider connections over the course of her life, it is clear that she often found herself in contradictory positions, and simultaneously holding opposing views, while attempting to balance her heritage with her ideals.

=== Religion ===
Maria Amparo Ruiz and Henry S. Burton found it difficult to plan their wedding. They belonged to different religions; she was Catholic and he was Protestant. Neither wished to change religions, and neither could be expected to do so: Burton was a national war hero and Ruiz de Burton belonged to a prominent Mexican Catholic family of Spanish lineage. Both the Bishop of Upper and Lower California and the Governor of California protested the planned nuptials, but the couple eventually persuaded a Protestant minister in Monterey to perform the ceremony. They were married on July 7, 1849, six days after her seventeenth birthday. Their differing religions made their marriage a scandal so much so, that the Catholic bishop of California had to grant ecclesiastic legitimacy to the wedding.

=== Family life ===
Ruiz de Burton gave birth to her first child, Nellie, on July 4, 1850. Two years later, the family moved to San Diego, where Burton commanded the Army post at Mission San Diego de Alcala. Ruiz de Burton and her husband were a popular couple in San Diego, and Ruiz de Burton started a small theatre company to feature soldier-actors. In 1853, the couple bought Rancho Jamul, outside San Diego. The couple homesteaded the ranch on March 3, 1854, with their daughter, and Ruiz de Burton's mother and brother. Their second child, a son, was born later that year on November 24. In 1859, Burton was sent to the East Coast. Ruiz de Burton and their two children accompanied the Captain there. On August 2, 1859, they left for Fort Monroe, Virginia, on a steamer via the Isthmus of Panama. Over the next ten years, they lived in Rhode Island, New York, Washington, D.C., Delaware and Virginia, as Ruiz de Burton's husband was transferred from post to post. The Union captured Petersburg, Virginia, in 1865. Burton was assigned to assist with Reconstruction of the city. He contracted malaria there and for the next five years suffered recurrent attacks of the illness. Burton died on April 4, 1869, of apoplexy resulting from the malarial attacks, in Newport, Rhode Island.

== Later life ==
Ruiz de Burton's husband was assigned to San Diego where the couple moved for eight years and had two children. Henry Burton bought a Mexican land grant, Rancho Jamul. In 1859 near the start of the civil war, Burton was ordered to serve in the Union army, and he, Ruiz, and the family moved to the East coast for a decade. She lived in "the highest military, political, and social circles,” and became friends with First Lady Mary Todd Lincoln. Maria was not as happy adjusting to “Yankee life,” describing it in a letter to a friend as “’a humbug so methodical and well supported that they even almost believe it.'” This gave her a close look at the corruption in the government, which she would later use in her writings critiquing U.S. society and government. Though she was part of U.S. society, she remained loyal to her roots. She used her writing to counter portrayals of Mexicans and critique discrimination of Californios from individuals and the state.

Henry Burton died in 1869 because of a malarial fever in Rhode Island, leaving her a 37-year-old widow. She then returned to San Diego. Unfortunately she found Rancho Jamul in pieces, some parts sold to cover her late husband's debts, and some parts occupied by squatters, made legal by the California Land Act of 1851. This stated that “all Mexican land grants are public domain and available for resettlement until a federal land commission could verify the legitimacy of land titles.” She was forced to go to court to fight for her land, and these legal fees drained her savings and she was forced to mortgage her land. To combat this once wrote her own legal briefs and to earn money she “planted castor beans on the rancho, considered using it for a water reservoir, and started a short-lived cement company, all to generate income beyond the meager widow’s pension she was receiving from the U.S. government.” Ruiz de Burton was an enterprising woman and engaged in various business dealings and entrepreneurial activities during this period in her life. In 1869, soon after she returned to the West Coast, Ruiz de Burton formed the Jamul Portland Cement Manufacturing Company with her son Henry and other financial backers. The company produced cement with lime produced from the limestone present in Rancho Jamul. The company closed in 1891. She never got her rancho back because the court proceedings lasted until after her death. She travelled continually on business connected to the various lawsuits she was involved in, and was in Chicago at the time of her death on August 12, 1895, when she succumbed to gastric fever. Her body was returned to San Diego for burial, where it was interred at Pioneer Park (San Diego).

== Literary career ==
Ruiz de Burton published two novels in her lifetime: Who Would Have Thought It? (1872) and The Squatter and the Don (1885). She is considered to be the first Mexican-American author and the first Mexican-American author to write in English. María Ruiz de Burton was important in literature because she addressed crucial issues of ethnicity, power, gender, class and race in her writing. Her life and writings demonstrate the historical contradictions of the Mexican American identity. Her writing shows a variety of influences; historical romance is often seen in British, French, Spanish and Mexican works while her realism and naturalism mirrors American writing. Her works challenge traditional American and Mexican American literary histories because they “openly critiqued northeastern materialism and portrayed California’s land-holding Mexicans as a genteel, white population wrongfully displaced in the United States by racism and corrupt politics. She is a Chicano author not just because of her race but because her novels investigate issues at the core of Chicano/a history and literature: identification, disidentification, dual nationality, citizenship, latinidad, and gender constraints. Even writing and publishing this book was an act of empowerment for the Californios. One of the most noteworthy aspects of Ruiz de Burton is her “sense of identification and nationality, her sense of displacement, her contradictory accommodation to and disidentification with the united States, her sense of a ‘Latin’ race beyond national identify and citizenship”.

=== Who Would Have Thought It? ===
Who Would Have Thought It? was the first novel to be written in English by a Mexican living in the United States. The book was published in 1872 by J.B. Lippincott in Philadelphia without the author's name on the title page, but was registered at the Library of Congress under the names of H.S. Burton and Mrs. Henry S. Burton. The book details the struggles of a Mexican-American girl born in Indian captivity, Lola, in an American society obsessed with class, religion, race and gender. "The novel scrutinizes the pettiness and racism of a Northern Abolitionist family and discourses on issues of democracy, liberalism, women's suffrage, imperialism, political opportunism, and religious hypocrisy." Ruiz shows “the fall of ‘republican motherhood,’ that is of ‘moral authority’ of a Yankee matron... [and] the fall of romantic conception of politics and the unmasking of liberal/democratic ideals” (76). Ruiz wants to dismantle perceptions of idealized democracy and justice in the U.S. and prove it to be corrupt and only just for the rich and powerful.

After its publication, Who Would Have Thought It? remained relatively unnoticed for over one hundred years in American literary studies, demonstrating Ruiz de Burton's exclusion from American literary history and more broadly the marginal importance that Mexican-Americans were considered to have in American history. The book was also excluded from popular American literature because of its depiction of American culture and morals as hypocritical.

A cooperative scholarly group called Recovering the United States Hispanic Literary Heritage Project brought Who Would Have Thought It? to public notice in the late twentieth century. This group was created in 1990 and its main goal is to recover literary texts by Hispanic writers and obtain narratives of their lives since the sixteenth century through sources such as memoirs, prose, fiction, poetry and histories. These scholars describe Ruiz de Burton's work "as an object lesson in the complexities and contradictions of resurrecting literary history".

=== The Squatter and the Don ===
The Squatter and the Don is Ruiz de Burton's most famous literary piece. It was published anonymously under the pen name "C. Loyal," an abbreviated form of "Ciudadano Leal," or "Loyal Citizen," a conventional method of closing official letters in nineteenth century Mexico. She used this name to symbolize her Mexican loyalties, to provide indeterminacy of her gender, and to criticize the American political system. This novel adopts the narrative perspective of a conquered Californio population that is a "capable, cultured, even heroic people who were unjustly deterritorialized, economically strangled, linguistically oppressed, and politically marginalized" despite the stipulations of the Treaty of Guadalupe Hidalgo of 1848, in which the United States agreed to respect the rights of Mexicans and Spanish citizens who were subsumed into the United States. The story of The Squatter and the Don fictionally documents the many Californio families that lost their land due to squatters and litigation. This book discusses the consequences of the Land Act of 1851 and the railroad monopoly in California, covering the time period of 1872 to 1885. The novel demonstrates how the burden of proof of land ownership fell not on the US government, nor on the squatters who settled on the land, but on the Californio landowners.

The Squatter and the Don is often incorrectly called a historical romance, but in actuality it is social reform fiction. It details not only the repercussions of the Land Act of 1851 after the US invasion of California but the rapid rise of the railroad monopoly in the state. The novel's plot, which roughly covers the period from 1872 to 1885, traces the trials and tribulations of ill-fated lovers from a Hispanic family and an Anglo family. The narrative builds on the tension between Californios of Mexican descent and the invading Anglo squatters by focusing on two families: the Alamars, the Californio owners of a massive ranch in the San Diego area, and the Darrells, one of the numerous squatter families on the Alamar ranch.

The novel focuses on the demise of a heroic society (the aristocratic Californios), but differs from other nineteenth century romances in that it is not written from the perspective of the conquerors, portraying a "backwards" people constrained by an outmoded order and unable to cope in the modern state. On the contrary, The Squatter and the Don is written from the perspective of the conquered, questioning whether the new order indeed brought progress to California, and if so, at what cost considering the immorality of the invaders: the squatters, the monopolists, the corrupt political leaders, and their legislation. Ultimately, the victims in the book are not only the Californios, but the squatters, the city of San Diego, and the entire California population, subject to the tyranny of the railroad monopoly in collusion with Congress and the state government.

==== Analysis ====
This story starts off with the invasion of Californio's land, but addresses other forms of ‘invasion’ that are as much economic and political as geographical. Ruiz wanted to illuminate U.S. society's cultural defamation of Mexican and Californios, as the U.S. marginalized them politically, economically, and socially. The victim pool increases from the Californios to the squatters... the city of San Diego, and in the long run, the entire state population now subject to tyranny of the railroad monopoly. Through this novel, Ruiz educates her readers on the immediacy of the issue and implores them to take action against the injustices the Californios suffered. To persuade her readers, Ruiz borrows from genres suited to social protest, including “verbatim legislation, the jeremiad, sentimental romance, and naturalism.” She urges readers to realize that problems faced by Californios affected all Californians. The U.S. conquering California was not natural or inevitable, and that the "result of discriminatory laws would be serious, possibly irreparable injury of its new citizenry.”

===== Racialization =====
A review in the San Francisco Chronicle calls the novel “a strong presentation of the influence of two evils which have done much to retard the growth of the state and to harass honest settlers.” Ruiz has the task of demolishing stereotypes set up by popular portrayals of Californios. Californios had been portrayed as being shallow, restless, pleasure-loving and lazy, compared to industrious and rational Americans. This portrayed rejection of U.S. culture led to a deserved downfall, which ties in conveniently with the U.S. expansionism. Ruiz does so by portraying the Alamars as aristocratic; she describes Doña as a queen, the sisters as princess; even the dog is named “Milord.” Ruiz wants to earn class mobility for aristocratic Californios. Since they have more in common with their Anglo counterparts than with working class Mexican Americans, they should be considered white. This Californio family is able to embrace democracy and capitalism, to show that they are not hopelessly in the past, doomed to vanish. Despite setbacks, the Alamars are able to join the urban market in San Francisco. The Alamars, and all Californios, can adapt to the capitalist system and by active members in the economy. Ruiz shows that Californios are dying out due to prejudice and corruption, not due to an essential characteristic of their race. The Alamar's future success seems to be due to Clarence, but he is not a “white rescuer.” His payment for the land was very little as he can double the money he spent in time. This actually shows how two races should work together in capitalism, both are able to flourish with “the infusion of Yankee capitalism.” Another element of the book that ties these races together is marriage. The story centers on Mercedes and Clarence, but there are many cross-cultural marriage, showing a mixture of races benefiting both, producing a better race. The unity of an Anglo woman and Mexican man dismantles the idea of Anglo objectification and ownership of Mexicans. These successful unions show “cultural hybridization."

Professor López at UCLA searched for information about public health policy during the 19th century for her article, “Feeling Mexican: Ruiz de Burton’s Sentimental Railroad Fiction.” but she was unable to find any because Mexican-Americans were not included in public health documents until the 20th century. When researching popular discourse about railroads, she found information of a Mexican railroad laborer who got Typhus at the railroad camp he was living at in Palmdale in 1916. Others in the city became fearful and insisted on hygiene education for laborers and stricter immigration laws. The laborers argued that the disease was not caused because they are Mexican, but because of dirty poor living conditions. The laborers petitioned for better living conditions and objected “the ways in which public health programs has taken control of the socio-political meaning of mexicanidad.” Squatter and the Don shows the link of race and railroad, and combats it through “deployment of the feeling body.” Because feeling is both physical and emotional, it crosses “gendered boundaries of sentiment.” Therefore, it can be determined railroad fiction. There are distinct differences between these Mexican railroad workers and the Californios in Ruiz's novel. The aristocratic Californios ins Squatter and the Don have feeling bodies while the Mexican railroad workers have laboring bodies. They find themselves in a similar situation though, as they both “[assert] their humanity – the universality of physical, against corporate objectification.” They both receive similar results. The Mexican rail workers only strengthen “corporate power as the agent of public discourse about the raced, Mexican body” and the Californios only “codify rather than dismantle the categories with which the novel takes issue,” which is a large critique of the work.

Ruiz's view on racialization is nuanced, as she proves the whiteness of Californios to create a gap between Californios and laboring Mexicans, Indians, and blacks. Furthermore, the disdain of Indians from the Californio's point of view is discussed which indicates the hierarchy of class, intelligence, and importance. Californios appear to be the middle man in sense of racial hierarchy because the strive to embraced by the Anglo community is apparent, but unachievable which also applies to the Indians. This “conscious drive towards assimilation… reveals Mexican American particularity” and calls for readers to “[rethink] of basic analytic categories such as… nations and nationalism.” When taking into account Ruiz's descriptions of the body, this work strays away from the Mexican American particularity and towards dismodernity. Dismodern “relies on the malleability of the human body and identity.” It “emphasizes physical difference and disability as unifying, ethical norm from whence new subjective categories and political identities will emerge,” and argues for “an ideology of interdependent bodies enjoying a symbiotic relationship with technology.” When one views Ruiz's work as a Latino dismodern, the “frailty of characters’ bodies is a direct reflection of the frailty of the nation.”

====== Sentimentalism ======
Ruiz uses another genre, sentimental fiction, to call for social reform, by using sentimentality chiefly to close ethnic divisions between her audience and her characters, appealing to the audience's emotions to create avenues of identification between the two groups. An aspects of sentimental fiction she includes is her characterization or woman as the moral center. The woman in this book, such as Mrs. Darrell, provide a moral compass and will even go behind the men's back to affect justice. They teach men more humane ways. This coupled with the narrator’s opinion on the exclusion of women in economics illustrates her distaste of the discrimination of women. The narrator states, “Man might take, and absolutely appropriate, monopolize and exclude her from money-making, from politics and from many other pursuits, made difficult to her by man's tyranny, man's hindrances, man's objections" (169). Another sentimental aspect is her romances filled with both swooning and sickness. This is a typical romance, and Ruiz even pokes fun at this to “highlight the contrast between the romanticization of the Californios by other authors such as Atherton and Josephine McCrackin” She also points out that the lovers are marrying a member from the same class to identify Californios as members of the same class as the white elite.

Some critics categorize this work as sentimental because descriptions of the body are written in sentimental language. Ruiz links the ability to feel with whiteness of skin. John González points out that Ruiz repeatedly uses the Alamars’ ability to blush as a sign of whiteness. This is a typical element of sentimental works, so scholars use this to prove that it is not a resistant text encouraging social reform. David Luis-Brown argues that since Ruiz constantly links feelings to whiteness and likens the Alamars to the Anglo-Americans, Squatter and the Don is complicit with, rather than resistant to, Anglo American imperial racism. However, this reading is only true if the novel is completely sentimental, which it is not due to an underlying playful tone. In Squatter and the Don," women [are] sentimentality against male physicality in argument for ethical citizenship and racial reconciliation," which brings Ruiz's opinions about race and gender under examination.

===== Criticism of the United States =====
Ruiz's work also has elements of determinism, the belief that all actions are determined by causes external to human will. Her characters are affected by things out of their control; the Californios face the legal system and Victoriano is crippled by a snowstorm. Though her work does include these events, Ruiz clearly favors the idea that humans do have control over their lives. When William Darrell blames himself for the Don's death, Clarence comforts him and blames a larger political force. William rejects this, saying he must accept blame and not just shift it on to others who also share in the blame. William's realization of the error of his ways creates hope for Californios. Another example of her belief that people can control their life is Don's response to Stanford's laissez faire business approach towards the railroad terminus. Don argues for a moral capitalism. Building a railroad terminus in San Diego will bring millions and not destroy others’ property interests. Ruiz gives Don this belief in possibility to hopefully instill the same belief in her readers. There is an opportunity for heroism in economics, and Clarence succeeds in this beneficent capitalism. She ends with Clarence and Mercedes together and the Alamars in San Francisco, showing that “she refuses to capitulate entirely to a deterministic worldview and, in the final pages, strikes a balance between leaving the reader with a bleak picture and offering some hope for the possibility of change."

The Californio's ability to have emotions and feelings accentuates the railroads’ self-serving greed. This novel shows clear distinctions between man and machine. López looks to where man and machine break down. These illnesses and deaths are not necessarily just political grievance. López asserts that Ruiz uses “broken bodies and sympathetic machines as arguments about the frailty of nations,” because “the body is always imperfect and the nation is always already composite, multiform, and interdependent.”

Ruiz's work does focus on race issues, considering she calls for “an essential Latin ‘difference,’ believing Latinos to be culturally and morally superior,” but her work also encompasses political issues. She warns against U.S. expansionism and corporate monopolies. For instance, in both her novels, she feminizes the male characters in order “to depict the subordinated status of those ‘handicapped’ by societal constraints”. These male characters are hurt by forces of decay and corruption. For example, in Squatter and the Don, the Californio men are victim to both illnesses and land loss because of the government. This novel centers on the corruption of the United States government due to the combination of capitalism with democracy. Ruiz paints the enemy here not to be the squatters, but the railroad barons. Even the Alamars and the Darrells, who in the end foster true love and marriage despite race, fall victim to the railroad barons.

===== Other =====
At the end of the novel, Ruiz drops fiction and addresses her readers. Though most of her argument is political, a religious aspect is added here as she starts and ends the conclusion quoting Utarian minister William Ellerly Channing, saying the Californians "must wait and pray for a Redeemer who will emancipate the white slaves of California" (344). This serves as final argument to connect the mistreatment of Californios to slavery. Though this book did not get the recognition it deserved, it ” continues to educate and persuade, providing insights into complex race relations that exist in California to this day and helping to undermine the myth of the "independent" West by pointing up the reliance of the railroads upon government subsidy and favor.”

=== Themes ===
María Ruiz de Burton has a few consistent themes running through her major works. These are the subordination of race, gender, and class. Class, gender, and race are all intertwined to illustrate the cultural constraints on women and how they should submit or be rejected. It also demonstrates the construction of the upper class and how chicanos are viewed. In her two princicpal works both major families are wealthy and have some sort of problem pertaining to finances.

==== Writing herself into fiction ====
It is widely considered that Ruiz de Burton's own life was a well-mined source for her fiction. The Squatter and the Don was inspired directly by her own experiences in the disputes over her land claims, and sought to contest official American histories of the conquest of California. The story targets squatters who attempted to claim the land that had previously been granted to Californios by the Mexican and Spanish governments, as well as corruption in the US judicial and legislative systems. Ruiz de Burton spent the last 23 years of her life engaged in legal battles to assert her claim of right to land that she and her husband had received in a grant before the Civil War. After her husband's death, Ruiz de Burton returned to her ranch only to find it occupied by numerous squatters whom she could never successfully force to leave through the US judicial system, treatment that she considered to be unfair and biased.

In Who Would Have Thought It?, the experience of Lola Medina, the protagonist of the story, mirrors many aspects of Ruiz de Burton's own life. The character of Lola is a daughter of an aristocratic Spanish family from Mexico, who is adopted by a respected New England doctor and taken to the East Coast. Lola is well educated, perfectly fluent in Spanish and English, good mannered, yet disrespected by the doctor's Protestant, white family and friends. Lola is ostracized due to her appearances. As a child her skin had been tinted to disguise her as an Indian, setting her apart from the very white ruling New England class. The doctor however, attempts to vouch for her, because he knows the truth of her background, and explains that she is not in fact "other" as her appearance suggests, but rather has "pure Spanish blood" of potentially royal lineage and deserves to be treated with due respect. In the conclusion of the novel, Lola Medina is sent away to Mexico to be with her family, suggesting that despite her belief and the belief of the educated doctor that she has legitimate right to be in the US, her true place is not there, but in Mexico. In Ruiz de Burtons own life, she was married young to a respected East Coast Protestant man, yet always felt herself to be an outsider in New England, despite her education, wealth, and European lineage. Her appearance and name always gave her away.

In her theater production, Don Quixote de la Mancha, the character of Don Quixote is seen by many scholars to be a stand-in for Ruiz de Burton herself. Quixote is interpreted as a California Hidalgo who has been tricked and conquered by jokesters (standing in for squatters) who faked having aristocratic lineage. Don Quixote's character is transformed from a Hidalgo into a Mexican-American, who rides through stolen lands believing that he is a Spanish savior who must right the wrongs that have injured his people and end the enchantment imposed by the occupiers. In the conclusion, Quixote is deemed a criminal, and ends up a displaced Californio, disgraced, lower-class, and with no one to defend him. Additionally, a manuscript of the play that Ruiz de Burton gave to a book collector has an inscription that reads: "A souvenir from Don Quixote the Author." Because of Ruiz de Burtons wit and use of satire in her writing, it is believable that she was intentionally making a statement with this inscription. In Ruiz de Burton's own experience, she spent much of her adult life defending her aristocratic lineage despite her poverty and second-class citizenry on lands that have become American through the actions of rogue squatters. The enchantment of Don Quixote's land is that Ruiz de Burton is no longer an aristocrat, but an impoverished woman.

==== Criticism of the US ====
Ruiz de Burton is very critical of the United States in her fiction, both objectively and in relation to her native Mexico. She accuses the US of childishly holding on to a provincial mentality, maintaining that Europe still sets the standard for cultural judgment. In The Squatter and the Don, the characters Clarence and Hubert discuss wines from California, which appears to be patronizing criticism of California from Northeasterners, but, according to Anne Elizabeth Goldman, is in fact more of a criticism of the provincial sensibilities maintained by Bostonians. Like the Norval sisters in Who Would Have Thought It? who travel to Europe to learn good taste, Clarence notes this mentality saying "Don't you know I like some of our California wines quite as well as the imported, if not better? I suppose I ought to be ashamed to admit it, thus showing my taste is not cultivated...I think sooner or later our wines will be better liked, better appreciated." Hubert responds: "I think so too, but for the present it is the fashion to cry down our native wines and extol the imported. When foreigners come to California to tell us that we can make good wines, that we have soils in which to grow the best grapes, then we will believe it, not before."

Ruiz de Burton is critical of US foreign policy in her fiction, accusing it of imperialist and hegemonic tendencies, contradictory to its intentions and foundation. In 1823, US President James Monroe delivered a statement declaring the US foreign policy regarding the Western Hemisphere henceforth, which became later known as the Monroe Doctrine. His message declared that the Western Hemisphere's move toward democracy and away from monarchy was inevitable and that the United States would usher in that transformation and protect any country in the Americas from future colonization by any European powers. This Doctrine remained virtually ignored in US politics until President James Polk told Congress in 1845 that "The American system of government is entirely different from that of Europe...a system of self-government which seems natural to our soil and which will ever resist foreign interference". However, the character Don Felipe in The Squatter and the Don says "Of course the ideas of this continent are different from those of Europe, be we all know that such would not be the case if the influence of the United States did not prevail with such despotic sway over the minds of the leading men of the Hispanic American republics. If it were not for this terrible, this fatal influence - which will eventually destroy us- the Mexicans, instead of seeing anything objectionable in the proposed change, would be proud to hail a prince who, after all, has some sore of claim to this land, and who will cut us loose from the leading strings of the United States."

== Theatre career ==
Ruiz de Burton is credited with the authorship and publication of one play, entitled Don Quixote de la Mancha: A Comedy in Five Acts, Taken from Cervantes' Novel of That Name, published in San Francisco, CA in 1876. The playwright is listed as Mrs. H.S. Burton. Ruiz de Burton was likely also the author of a number of plays performed at the Mission San Diego by US Army soldiers under the command of her husband.

Many scholars interpret Ruiz de Burton's rewriting Cervantes' novel, Don Quixote de la Mancha, as an effort to reclaim her cultural heritage on California lands. Ruiz de Burton spent roughly the last twenty years of her life fighting legal battles to assert her right to her family's land in California, but her efforts proved to be futile in the face of the American concept of Manifest Destiny which gave legitimacy to the squatters who had settled on her lands and the racism towards non-white residents in the US.

In the novel, Don Quixote pursues a life of knight errantry, roaming the land seeking chivalrous adventures in an attempt to maintain the culture of his nostalgia. Many scholars read Quixote's character in Ruiz de Burton's play as being the author herself, a California Hidalgo out to defend the fading culture of the Hacienda life. The play concludes with Quixote defeated and shamed, conquered by jokesters who profess aristocratic lineage.

Some scholars consider the play to be a reenactment of the mismanagement by the Spanish of Alta California that allowed it to be easily taken by the United States. Don Quixote then is a California Hidalgo, transformed into a Mexican American, who rides through stolen lands believing he is a Spanish saviour with the duty to redress the wrongs of his people. The final defeat and imprisonment of Don Quixote at the hands of the jokesters is a symbolic death to Ruiz de Burton's aristocratic heritage and her land rights.

== Political ideals ==
Although María Ruiz de Burton's novels are politically charged it is hard to analyze specific aspects of her political ideals with any level of certainty. Therefore, analyzing her characters is one way to take a step into how Ruiz de Burton felt about the political situations happening during her lifetime. There is a conflict in her novels where there is support for individuality, political freedom, and equality for women, while the novel is vague in its judgement of democracy for mass politics.

In order to make any claims as to the political ideals that Mrs. Burton held one would have to draw parallels from her novels to the political and social turmoil during her lifetime. Readers of Who Would Have Thought It? are able to draw some of her cultural politics from the book. The satirical style of Who Would Have Thought It? demonstrates her unhappiness with the current institutions of the American lifestyle through a Mexican perspective. Religion and morality are two abstractions she criticizes in this book. She parodies the Protestant's belief that they are the official religion of the United States.

As well as critiquing religion, she also evaluates other aspects of American culture. Her commentary is aimed at disentangling the Anglo-American contradictions in their society in view of the Mexican American. "Her use of satire and parody unmasks the rhetoric of Manifest Destiny and displays the hypocrisy among New Englanders who espouse piety and condemn the South's alliance with slavery, yet demonstrate the opposite through their actions". Here in Who Would Have Thought It? she battles against the Anglo-American culture to illustrate the injustices and violations committed on their part against her own heritage.

However, this her books touch on many other political issues, such as gender equality. The issue of land ownership by women is brought up in her book The Squatter and the Don. At the time, Mexican and Spanish law allowed women to have rights to property and wealth. However, this was not then common practice in the United States. One gathers that Ruiz de Burton did not take too kindly to being refused an entitlement to land. This is because women were not considered equal according to U.S. law and by custom. This was combined with the marked prejudice against Mexicans at the time to become a major issue for Mrs. Burton.

"As a romantic racialist/romantic feminist strategy of vindicating groups exploited on the basis of region, race, culture, class, or gender, sentimentalism links gender politics to racial caste politics."

Another issue pertaining to land ownership is brought up in "The Squatter and the Don". Primarily land dispossession of the Hispanic Californians. Because she was a Californian ranchero this book is an example of her victimization. The novel was a tool to sway public opinion on her behalf. This was a daunting task because of the audience for whom she had to write. "... Ruiz de Burton had to write in English to address a mainly English-speaking readership, but she also had to incorporate some Spanish to be truthful to her characters and settings. Her efforts resulted in one of the first published examples of Spanish-English code mixing in American Literature". Doing this helped Ruiz de Burton open her ideals to a broader market, thus helping cast her beliefs about land litigation to the very people from who she felt victimized. She was trying to cajole *(convince? or cajole into doing something?)* the Anglo majority of the unfair conduct towards the top-tiered Californians.

Some critics claim that Ruiz de Burton "sympathized with the defeated Confederacy, seeing in the South's defeat a mirror of the defeat of Mexico in 1848, and in Reconstruction, a clear imposition of Yankee hegemony on the Southern states" Ruiz de Burton was not alone in California in her expressions of sympathy towards the Confederacy. In the 1850s, Mexican Americans were a majority in Los Angeles, the city was considered a pro-slavery and Democratic town. One can see Ruiz de Burton's identification with the fallen Confederacy in chapter III of The Squatter and the Don. Here, Ruiz de Burton references a term conceived by white southerners, "carpet baggers," used to hinder northerners from moving to the South during the Reconstruction era of the United States. Indeed, The Squatter and the Don depicts "political views that emerge from this liberalism as naive, weak, and ineffectual in defending Mexican interests against "Yankee" aggression. This weakness is often figured by the physical illness of male Californio characters..." Ruiz de Burton believed that the U.S. government and especially the judicial system do not in fact serve the people in the United States, but rather, the interests of capital and those who control Congress.

Again Ruiz de Burton criticizes Anglo-American aristocrats through her book The Squatter and the Don. The novel describes the account of Californio aristocrats being reduced to common laborers through dispossession. This can be read as a parallel to the "loss of Ruiz de Burton's landed status subverted her own class and racial positioning within post-Reconstruction U.S. society".

María Ruíz de Burton's unique position as an insider (and consequently an outsider) on both sides of the US/Mexican border afforded her a unique perspective from which to view the political tempest taking place between the two nations. She would always see the rising hegemony of the Anglo-American cultural, economic, and political spheres from a Latin-American frame of reference, but she was able to penetrate that same dominant society and manipulate its system to serve her purposes. Her anti-imperialist ideals were made all the more potent by her understanding of and interaction with the United States. By stripping down and criticizing the complex organization of US policy, she learned that those very constructs could be used as a key component in playing their game. Ruíz de Burton was able to assume different and often opposing identities to suit her needs. Her position as an insider granted her access to the same political, legal, and economic system that she critiques in her literature, while still managing to maintain the standpoint of a distrustful "other".

== List of works ==
- Burton, Mrs. H S (1872), Who Would Have Thought It? A Novel ..., Philadelphia: J.B. Lippincott & Co., OCLC 16651194, archived from the original on 2012-02-13. Republished as Ruiz de Burton, María Amparo (1995), Sánchez, Rosaura; Pita, Beatrice (eds.), Who Would Have Thought It?, Houston: Arte Público, pp. vii–lxv, ISBN 978-1-55885-081-1.
- Ruiz de Burton, María Amparo (1885), The Squatter and the Don: A Novel Descriptive of Contemporary Occurrences in California, San Francisco: S. Carson & Co., OCLC 4323620. Republished as Ruiz de Burton, María Amparo (1992), Sánchez, Rosaura; Pita, Beatrice (eds.), The Squatter and the Don, Houston: Arte Público Press, ISBN 978-1-55885-055-2.
- Ruiz de Burton, María Amparo (2001), Sánchez, Rosaura; Pita, Beatrice (eds.), Conflicts of Interest: The Letters of María Amparo Ruiz De Burton, Houston, TX: Arte Público, ISBN 978-1-55885-328-7.

== See also ==
- Social novel
- Chicano literature
- Californio
- Sentimental novel
