= KVWG =

KVWG may refer to:

- KVWG-FM, a radio station (95.3 FM) licensed to Dilley, Texas, United States
- KMFR, a radio station (1280 AM) licensed to Pearsall, Texas, which held the call sign KVWG from 2005 to 2011
