= KQBQ =

- Meyersville, Texas; United States
- Frequency: 100.1 MHz
- Branding: No Bull Radio Network

Programming
- Format: Classic country

Ownership
- Owner: Rufus Resources, LLC

History
- First air date: 2017
- Last air date: October 1, 2026

Technical information
- Licensing authority: FCC
- Facility ID: 198766
- Class: A
- ERP: 4,100 watts
- HAAT: 63.6 meters (209 ft)
- Transmitter coordinates: 28.865833°N 97.360278°W

Links
- Public license information: Public file; LMS
- Website: www.nobullradio.com

KQBQ (100.1 FM) was a radio station licensed to serve the community of Meyersville, Texas. The station was owned by Rufus Resources, LLC, and aired a classic country format as part of a group of stations in South Texas branded as the "No Bull Radio Network", based at KCAF-FM in Kenedy.

The station was assigned the KQBQ call letters by the Federal Communications Commission (FCC) on January 20, 2017.

On October 1, 2026, Rufus Resources surrendered all its licenses, including KQBQ, to the FCC; the "No Bull Radio" programming continues as an Internet radio station via Live365, with Rufus noting the shutdown eliminates the geographic limits to its AM and FM signals.
