= Center for Cultural Studies =

Center for Cultural Studies may refer to:

- Américo Paredes Center for Cultural Studies
- Centre for Contemporary Cultural Studies (a.k.a. Birmingham Center for Cultural Studies)
