= KTNR =

KTNR may refer to:

- KTNR-LD, a low-power television station (channel 2, virtual 29) licensed to serve Laredo, Texas, United States; see List of television stations in Texas
- KCAF-FM, a radio station (92.1 FM) licensed to serve Kenedy, Texas, which held the call sign KTNR from 1982 to 2014
