= KVWG-FM =

- Dilley, Texas; United States
- Frequency: 95.3 MHz
- Branding: No Bull Radio

Programming
- Format: Classic country

Ownership
- Owner: David Martin Phillip and Marguerite Phillip; (Rufus Resources, LLC)

History
- First air date: 1985
- Last air date: October 1, 2026
- Former call signs: KRNX (2001); KMFR (2001)

Technical information
- Licensing authority: FCC
- Facility ID: 52047
- Class: A
- ERP: 750 watts
- HAAT: 24.5 meters
- Transmitter coordinates: 28°40′23″N 99°10′8″W

Links
- Public license information: Public file; LMS
- Website: nobullradio.com

KVWG-FM (95.3 FM) was a radio station broadcasting a classic country format. The station was licensed to Dilley, Texas, United States, and was last owned by David Martin Phillip and Marguerite Phillip, through licensee Rufus Resources, LLC.

== History ==
The station was assigned the call letters KVWG-FM on April 25, 1983. On March 2, 2001, the station changed its call sign to KRNX; on March 9, 2001, to KMFR, then on April 17, 2001, back to KVWG-FM.

According to Federal Communications Commission (FCC) filings, the station (then owned by Pearshall RadioWorks) ceased operations on May 31, 2006, due to "a number of equipment-related problems" and to improve the antenna. In 2007, after the FCC approved the new antenna's operations, the station was sold to Univision Radio.

Effective October 16, 2014, Univision sold the station to David Martin Phillip and Marguerite Phillip's Enduring Oil Exploration, LLC for $12,500. The station's license was transferred to co-owned Rufus Resources, LLC on October 22, 2014.

In its later years, KVWG-FM operated as part of Rufus Resources' "No Bull Radio" network, a regional network of classic country stations in South Texas based at KCAF-FM in Kenedy. On October 1, 2026, Rufus Resources surrendered all its licenses, including KVWG-FM, to the FCC; the "No Bull Radio" programming continues as an Internet radio station via Live365, with Rufus noting the shutdown eliminates the geographic limits to its AM and FM signals.
