= KMFR =

- Pearsall, Texas; United States
- Broadcast area: San Antonio metropolitan area
- Frequency: 1280 kHz
- Branding: No Bull Radio

Programming
- Format: Classic country

Ownership
- Owner: David Martin Phillip and Marguerite Phillip; (Rufus Resources, LLC)

History
- First air date: 1962
- Last air date: October 1, 2026
- Former call signs: KVWG (1962–2004); KSAH (2004); KTFM (2004–2005); KILM (2005); KVWG (2005–2011)
- Call sign meaning: "Mighty Fine Rock" (former branding when calls were used on 103.7 KMFR)

Technical information
- Licensing authority: FCC
- Facility ID: 52048
- Class: D
- Power: 460 watts (day); 190 watts (night)
- Transmitter coordinates: 28°53′13.9″N 99°6′41.1″W
- Translator: 94.7 K234DG (Pearsall)

Links
- Public license information: Public file; LMS
- Website: nobullradio.com

KMFR (1280 AM) was a radio station broadcasting a classic country format. Licensed to Pearsall, Texas, United States, the station served the San Antonio metropolitan area. The station was owned by David Martin Phillip and Marguerite Phillip, through licensee Rufus Resources, LLC.

== History ==
The station was first licensed, as KVWG, on April 25, 1963. It changed its call sign to KSAH on May 10, 2004. Ten days later, the station changed its call sign to KTFM; on January 19, 2005, to KILM; on January 26, 2005, back to KVWG; and on September 21, 2011, to KMFR.

In its later years, KMFR operated as part of Rufus Resources' "No Bull Radio" network, a regional network of classic country stations in South Texas based at KCAF-FM in Kenedy. On October 1, 2026, Rufus Resources surrendered all its licenses, including KMFR, to the Federal Communications Commission; the "No Bull Radio" programming continues as an Internet radio station via Live365, with Rufus noting the shutdown eliminates the geographic limits to its AM and FM signals. The license was cancelled on October 5.
