= WYU =

WYU may refer to:

- Weiyuan County, an administrative division of Sichuan
- West Yangon University
- Wuyi University (Guangdong)
- Wuyuan railway station
- ウュ (wyu), a katakana digraph

== See also ==
- KWYU, a Texas radio station
- WNCL (formerly WYUS), a Delaware radio station
