= KCAF-FM =

Radio station in Kenedy, Texas

- Kenedy, Texas; United States
- Frequency: 92.1 MHz
- Branding: No Bull Radio

Programming
- Format: Classic country

Ownership
- Owner: David Martin Phillip; (Rufus Resources, LLC)

History
- First air date: 1982
- Last air date: October 1, 2026
- Former call signs: KTNR (1982–2014)

Technical information
- Licensing authority: FCC
- Facility ID: 67179
- Class: A
- ERP: 6,000 watts
- HAAT: 80 meters
- Transmitter coordinates: 28°45′35″N 97°51′45″W

Links
- Public license information: Public file; LMS
- Website: nobullradio.com

KCAF-FM (92.1 FM) was a classic country radio station licensed to Kenedy, Texas, United States. The station was last owned by David Martin Phillip, through licensee Rufus Resources, LLC.

Before 2014, the then-KTNR was a Hispanic Christian radio station, branded "Radio Ola". The owners operated out of San Antonio as a non-commercial station, but the business was not successful.

However, in late 2013 or early 2014, it changed to commercial status and re-launched with a country music mix. It featured both new and classic country and operated like a community station, running advertisements for local businesses, churches, and so on. The station changed its call sign to KCAF-FM call sign on May 19, 2014.

KCAF-FM would serve as the first station in the "No Bull Radio" network, a regional network of classic country stations in South Texas that would go on to include KVWG-FM in Dilley; KWYU in Christine; KQBQ in Meyersville; KBQQ in Smiley; KUFA in Hebbronville; KIBQ in Austwell; KMFR in Pearsall; and KIBL in Beeville. On October 1, 2026, Rufus Resources surrendered all its licenses, including KCAF-FM, to the Federal Communications Commission; the "No Bull Radio" programming continues as an Internet radio station via Live365, with Rufus noting the shutdown eliminates the geographic limits to its AM and FM signals.

== Translators ==
In addition to the main station, KCAF-FM was relayed by an additional five translators to widen its broadcast area.

| Call sign | Frequency | City of license | FID | ERP (W) | Class | FCC info |
|---|---|---|---|---|---|---|
| K273BL | 102.5 FM | Beeville, Texas | | 50 | D | |
| K271AQ | 102.1 FM | Cuero, Texas | | 50 | D | |
| K229BJ | 93.7 FM | Hollywood Park, Texas | 139150 | 62 | D | LMS |
| K221EX | 92.1 FM | Lackland City, Texas | | 50 | D | |
| K292FK | 106.3 FM | Pleasanton, Texas | | 250 | D | |
