= The Ballad of Gregorio Cortez =

1982 film

- Theatrical release poster
- Directed by: Robert M. Young
- Screenplay by: Victor Villaseñor; Robert M. Young
- Based on: With His Pistol in His Hand by Américo Paredes
- Produced by: Moctesuma Esparza; Michael Hausman
- Starring: Edward James Olmos
- Cinematography: Reynaldo Villalobos
- Edited by: John Bertucci; Arthur Coburn
- Music by: W. Michael Lewis; Edward James Olmos
- Production companies: American Playhouse; Corporation for Public Broadcasting; Filmhaus Productions; Moctesuma Esparza Productions; NCLR; National Endowment for the Humanities
- Distributed by: Embassy Pictures
- Release dates: 1982 (limited); May 4, 1983 (USA Film Festival); August 19, 1983 (United States)
- Running time: 106 minutes
- Country: United States
- Languages: English; Spanish
- Box office: $804,963

The Ballad of Gregorio Cortez is a 1982 American Western crime film directed by Robert M. Young and starring Edward James Olmos as Gregorio Cortez. It is based on the 1958 book With His Pistol in His Hand by Americo Paredes.

In 2022, the film was selected for preservation in the United States National Film Registry by the Library of Congress as being "culturally, historically or aesthetically significant."

== Plot ==
Set in Belmont-Gonzales, Texas in 1901. After a misunderstanding, a Mexican-American farmer kills a sheriff. He eludes capture and becomes a folk hero. When he is eventually caught, he is tried seven times before finally being released after twelve years in prison.

== Cast ==
- Edward James Olmos as Gregorio Cortez
- Victoria Plata as Carmen Cortez
- James Gammon as Frank Fly
- Tom Bower as Boone Choate
- Bruce McGill as Reporter Blakely
- Brion James as Captain Rogers
- Alan Vint as Mike Trimmell
- Timothy Scott as Sheriff Morris
- Pepe Serna as Romaldo Cortez
- Michael McGuire as Sheriff Glover
- William Sanderson as Cowboy
- Barry Corbin as B.R. Abernathy
- Jack Kehoe as Prosecutor Pierson
- Rosanna DeSoto as Carlota Muñoz
- Ned Beatty as Lynch Mob Leader

== Reception and legacy ==
The review aggregation website Rotten Tomatoes reported a 100% approval rating with an average rating of 7.67/10 based on 6 reviews.

Janet Maslin of The New York Times said, "[The film] tells what sounds like a stirring story, and its plainness would seem to be an asset. But something more was needed here, if not in the way of fireworks then maybe just in verisimilitude. The events may be real, and even the settings are authentic; the courthouse in which Mr. Young filmed the trial scene is the one in which Mr. Cortez's trial actually took place. That's not the sort of authenticity that the film lacks. What it's missing is the spark, surprise and immediacy that might have made its principals feel like people, rather than key figures in a well-meaning historical pageant."

=== Accolades ===
Rosanna DeSoto won the Golden Eagle Award for Best Actress for her performance in the film.

The film also won a Special Jury Prize given by film critic Roger Ebert at the 1983 Sundance Film Festival.

=== Preservation ===
The Ballad of Gregorio Cortez was preserved by the Academy Film Archive in 2016.

== See also ==
- Latin American cinema
- 1982 in film
- 1983 in film
