= Lymari Nadal =

Puerto Rican actress

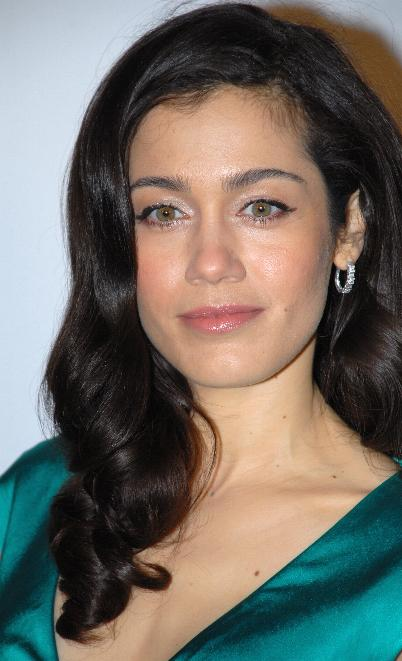
- Nadal in 2007
- Born: 11 February 1978 (age 48); Ponce, Puerto Rico
- Education: Pontifical Catholic University of Puerto Rico
- Known for: Acting; producer; screenwriter
- Notable work: América; American Gangster
- Spouse: Edward James Olmos (m. 2002; sep. 2013)
- Occupations: Film actress; producer; scriptwriter
- Years active: 2002–present

Lymari Nadal Torres (born 11 February 1978) is a Puerto Rican actress, film producer and scriptwriter. She has performed in films including American Gangster and Battlestar Galactica: The Plan. In 2011, she starred in America, which she co-wrote.

== Early life and education ==
Nadal was born in Ponce, Puerto Rico, to Daniel Nadal and Anaida Torres. She graduated from high school at Academia Santa María, and received a college degree from the Pontifical Catholic University of Puerto Rico. She has described herself as "Ponce-blooded."

== Personal life ==
In 2001, she moved to Los Angeles, California, and married actor and director Edward James Olmos in 2002. They separated in 2013.

== Filmography ==
Film	Year	Role
American Family	2002	Linda
Battlestar Galactica Miniseries	2003	Giana
Ladrones y Mentirosos	2006	Marisol
American Gangster	2007	Eva
Battlestar Galactica: The Plan	2009	Giana O'Neill
America	2011	America
Light from the Darkroom	2014	Blanca
Then There Was	2014	Julia
Kreep	2016	Kreep
