= America (2011 film) =

2011 film directed by Sonia Fritz

- Film poster
- Directed by: Sonia Fritz
- Written by: Sonia Fritz; Miguel Machalski; Lymari Nadal
- Produced by: Frances Lausell
- Starring: Lymari Nadal
- Cinematography: Willie Berrios
- Release date: 11 March 2011
- Running time: 95 minutes
- Country: Puerto Rico
- Language: Spanish

America is a 2011 Puerto Rican drama film directed by Sonia Fritz based on a published fiction novel El Sueño de America (1996) by Puerto Rican author Esmeralda Santiago. The film was selected as the Puerto Rican entry for the Best Foreign Language Film at the 84th Academy Awards, but was disqualified because of a rule change.

== Cast ==
- Lymari Nadal as America
- Yancey Arias as Correa
- Yareli Arizmendi as Maria
- Talia Rothenberg as Rosalinda
- Marisé Alvarez as Elena
- Teresa Hernández as Paulina
- Eyra Aguero Joubert as Lourdes
- Edward James Olmos as Mr. Irving
- Frank Perozo as Dario
- Tony Plana as Leopoldo
- Isaac Santiago as NYC Cop#1
- Monica Steuer as Karen Leverett
- Rachel Ticotin as Esther

== See also ==
- List of submissions to the 84th Academy Awards for Best Foreign Language Film
- List of Puerto Rican submissions for the Academy Award for Best Foreign Language Film
