= Kenedy Independent School District =

School district in Texas, United States

Address
- 401 FM 719 Kenedy, Texas, 78119; United States
- Coordinates: 28.8291°N 97.8562°W

District information
- Grades: PK–12
- Schools: 4
- NCES District ID: 4825440

Students and staff
- Students: 770 (2023–2024)
- Teachers: 63.45 (on an FTE basis)
- Student–teacher ratio: 12.14:1

Other information
- Website: www.kenedyisd.com

Kenedy Independent School District is a public school district based in Kenedy, Texas (USA).

The district has three campuses - Kenedy High (Grades 9–12), Kenedy Middle (Grades 6–8), and Kenedy Elementary (Grades PK–5).

In 2009, the school district was rated "academically acceptable" by the Texas Education Agency.
