= With His Pistol in His Hand =

1958 book by Américo Paredes

With His Pistol in His Hand is a book about Gregorio Cortez written by Américo Paredes. It was published by the University of Texas Press and first printed in 1958.

Cortez was turned into a ballad hero by the Mexican American community after allegedly murdering sheriff W.T. (Brack) Morris and evading law enforcement for a few months. Paredes used materials from historical records of Cortez and his time, ballads that used him as the central figures and folklore to present to his reader an analysis of Gregorio Cortez both as the person and as the mythical hero.

The book is 274 pages long with eight chapters, a bibliography section, and an index.

== Synopsis ==
The first part of the book focuses on the Cortez legend. Part two is a literary study on corrido and ballads about Cortez that analyzes the rhyme scheme and the technical parts of these folksongs.

=== Part 1 ===
==== Chapter I: The Country ====
Paredes explained the historical context of the late 19th to early 20th century in the Mexico-United States border states, which include Texas, the origin of Cortez's ballads. He analyzed the border populations of the Nuevo Santander area and the demographics of the population to show to his readers the historical opposition between the Mexican Americans and Anglo Americans. Paredes describes the emergence of the Texas Rangers, stating that the Rangers used masculine myths to impose a sense of horror on the population.

==== Chapter II: The Legend ====
Paredes' story is a version of the Gregorio Cortez legend. Cortez's brother Ramón owns two sorrel mares that look identical. One horse is lame and the other is healthy. An Anglo American offers to buy the healthy horse from Ramón. Despite Ramón's constant rejections, the Anglo American continues to bother Ramón. Annoyed, Ramón secretly sells the lame horse to the buyer. After discovering the fraud, the buyer asks sheriff Morris to arrest Ramón. Facing the two Cortez brothers on their family front porch in Manor, Texas (northeast of Austin), Sheriff Morris shoots and kills Ramón. Gregorio draws a revolver from his belt-line behind his back and shoots down Morris, then while Morris lies on the ground Cortez shoots him dead. Cortez soon rides away and goes into hiding.

Texas rangers pursued Cortez; there were many chases but they never caught him. Cortez never shot any of his pursuers. He was frequently sheltered by fellow Mexican Americans, among whom he was a hero.

Cortez is eventually captured when a man named El Teco brings a group of law enforcement to Cortez and surrounds him. Cortez surrenders. During his trial, prosecutors cannot convict Cortez for murder because it was an act of self-defense. Later he is convicted and sentenced to prison.

According to one legendary version of the story, President Abraham Lincoln's daughter (in reality, Lincoln never had a daughter) becomes enamored of Cortez and persuades her father to pardon him. Cortez refuses the pardon and dies in prison a year later from poisoning. In real life, Cortez was pardoned.

==== Chapter III: The Man ====
Paredes uses primary sources such as newspapers or interviews with Valeriano Cortez, Gregorio Cortez's second child, to document the true story of Cortez. The study first briefly introduces Cortez's characteristics and his physical appearance. Then it moves to introduce the historical reality of Cortez's escape and his capture.

Paredes theorizes that a translation issue during the confrontation with Morris resulted in his death. Paredes also suggests that the "Lincoln's daughter" figure arose from one of the many mistresses that Cortez had in real life. The chapter also explains how Cortez's deeds inspired much help and sympathetic emotions from Anglo and Mexican Americans after his imprisonment. However, Paredes states that, for many Mexicans, the Cortez affair increased hatred toward their community, leading to many cases of violence and victimization. Toward the end, the chapter analyzes how all these supports from society led to Cortez's pardon and how he eventually died shortly after being released.

==== Chapter IV: The Hero's Progress ====
Paredes looks at historical sources about the earlier version of the myth and its origin. Paredes first tells his readers that the myth included in Chapter II is a version of the myth created by himself. His re-write is based on different variants of the story that he believes best represent the folklore and is more far-fetched from the truth.

Paredes introduces different variants of the story that he does not include in Chapter II. He unifies all these variants to analyzes the myth. He concludes different variants of the myth all reflect something about the person who tells that variant. He then divides the myth into three components: the fact, the exaggerated fact, and purely mythical imagination and assigned different parts of his version of the myth under these categories. Finally, he analyzes how Cortez embodies the inoffensive Mexican who defends his rights and eventually betrayed and self-sacrificed just like Jesus Christ. He concludes that the image of a hero like Cortez has long existed in the Mexican Americans' imaginations, and his deeds manifested into this well-known story.

=== Part 2 ===
==== Chapter V: The Corrido on the Border ====
This chapter explains how the literary form corrido, a specific form of ballad developed in the Lower Rio Grande Valley, became the dominant format people use to compose songs about conflicts between the Mexican and Anglo Americans. Paredes then expand the time period before corrido emerged, and then he goes on to explore the earliest corridos he has found. He looks at the different forms of border conflicts documented in corridos: the borderer's conflict with the Texas Rangers and the fuereño (Spanish for 'outsider' or 'foreigner'). Eventually, these ballads about conflicts became the dominating form amongst all other forms of border balladry.

==== Chapter VI: Variants of Gregorio Cortez ====
This chapter is a compilation of the 12 variants of the ballads about Cortez that Paredes has either collected or created himself in his research process. He arranges the variants from the Mexico Broadside version to variants X, A, B, C, D, E, F, G, H, and I. In this collection, the Mexico Broadside version is the longest, containing twenty-eight quatrains, while variant I is the shortest, with only six quatrains.

==== Chapter VII: Gregorio Cortez, a Study ====
Using the twelve different variants, Paredes provides a literary analysis of the Cortez ballads, explaining the sources in the different variants. Since he collected the Mexico Broadside Version from a Mexico City newspaper, he explicitly says that it will not be the subject of the chapter that centers on border ballad. Variants A through I, are all from primary sources that Valeriano Cortez provided Variant X was his personal attempt to re-create the original corrido, from which all these variants stemmed. His reconstruction took lines from these variants and putting them together in chronological order in a fundamental narrative style and hence should be utilized in the missing original version. Paredes extracted different rhyme schemes, motifs, and themes from these variants, comparing them to medieval romance ballads and other border ballads to show how and why Gregorio Cortez's corrido is exceptional .

Here is the English version of variant I of the ballad that Paredes included in his book:

"Gregorio Cortez was riding/ With his Pistol in His Hand/'I don't regret having killed them;/ I regret my brother's death.'/ He struck out for Piedras Negras,/Without showing any fear,/'Follow me, cowardly rangers, I am Gregorio Cortez.'/ The Americans were riding/So fast they seemed to fly,/For they wanted to get/Ten thousand dollars they were offered./The Americans were sayin,/'If we catch up with him, what/shall we do?/If we come to him with soft words,/ Very few of us will be left.'/Then said Gregorio Cortez,/ And his soul was all aflame,/ 'I won't surrender my arms/Until I am in a cell."/ On the next day, in the morning/ He surrendered of his own accord,/ "You can take me if I'm willing,/But not any other way.'/"

==== Chapter VIII: A Last Word ====
Paredes synthesizes the examination of the corrido and the study of its origin. Paredes underscores that he wishes for people to recognize the corrido of Gregorio Cortez as a prototype product born from the conflicts on the U.S.-Mexico border. He urges people from different cultures to better understand each other's world as they reach this recognition.

== Writing process ==
=== Inspiration ===
After returning to the United States from Asia in the 1950s, Paredes enrolled in the University of Texas at Austin for his master's degree, with a primary focus on literature. During his last semester, he enrolled in a course centered on I.A Richards's "Practical Criticism". Paredes's weekly assignments asked him to compare two different pieces of obscure literature. In one of these assignments, he received two versions of the Scottish ballad "Sir Patrick Spens". He realized that although one of the versions read better as a written manuscript, it failed to be as appealing when being sung out as the second one. Paredes knew that others would not favor his ideas in the field of literary criticism, which did not recognize the importance of the context, yet the stubborn student persevered. He further proved his assertion that contexts are essential by adding the corrido, a form of balladry he was familiar with from his Mexican American background.

After reading Paredes' assignment, the instructor advised him to have a conversation with another faculty member Robert Stephenson, who was teaching several courses in folklore at the time. Paredes did so, and the talk prompted him to focus his study in the area of folklores. Being an associate professor in both English and Spanish, Stephenson also influenced him into eventually choosing "El Corrido de Gregorio Cortez" as his topic for the Ph.D. dissertation. Paredes also wanted to combat what he felt were the unreal stereotypes of Mexicans that circulated in U.S. society at the time. As he said in his authorized biography, that "I was very much aware...that our heritage was not being given the respect that it deserved."

=== Writing the work ===
In an interview, he said that he took more courses in Spanish than he did in English. Moreover, geographic location allowed him access to a lot of the rare primary sources. Not only did he look at court documents related to Cortez, he even had a chance to personally interview Cortez's son, Valeriano Cortez.

The Cortez family was very significant for Paredes's study, for they provided him what he considers to be the real story of Cortez. Paredes further familiarized himself with this particular format of ballads. He later became a performer of corridos and was invited to a lecture in the "Music in Cultures" lecture series.

== Contemporary reception and publication ==
=== Problems in the UT System ===
Paredes's scholarship faced two significant problems when trying to get approval from the English department at UT Austin.

The first problem was that it was about a Spanish ballad of a Mexican hero, yet Paredes's concentration was on English ballads with a Medieval basis.

The other problem was that it openly criticized another folklorist Walter Prescott Webb and the Texas Rangers for their biased opinions against the Mexican population. Webb had written the book "The Texas Rangers: A Century of Frontier Defense". According to Paredes, Webb created a heroic image of the Texas Rangers by contrasting them with stereotypical images of the Mexican populations. Webb upheld the Anglo Americans' falsified view of border conflicts with the "tough" Rangers on one side valiantly fighting against the "cruel" Mexicans. Paredes disputed this concept.

Paredes's dissertation was approved. His struggle with Webb, however, escalated into something personal. Paredes later described that Webb made him feel like "I didn't expect for him to like me, but if looks could kill, I would have been dead a long time ago."

=== Recognition from Stith Thompson ===
In 1955, folklorist Stith Thompson was invited to UT Austin from Indiana University as a visiting professor. He was placed in the same department as Paredes because both studied folklores and ballads at the time.

Paredes quickly became acquainted with Thompson, who later showed great interest in his ongoing project, the study on Cortez and corridos. Paredes handed him a manuscript of the dissertation for a review. Thompson found the work impressive after reading it, so he eventually handed the manuscript to the University of Texas Press and asked them to publish it.

=== Publishing ===
After finishing his Ph.D. program in 1956, Paredes went to El Paso to teach at the English Department of then-Texas School of Mines. Frank W. Wardlaw, the University of Texas Press director told Paredes that he liked the draft of the Cortez book, but had a few revisions.

- remove negative comments on Webb
- tone down his "bitter attitude" against the Texas Rangers. Paredes later believed that they wanted him to do this revision out of fear of legal issues from the Rangers.
- cut down the length of the book by one-third or one-fourth.

Paredes and the press went through some negotiations and made some changes. Without a final review by Paredes, the director pushed the book directly to the printing process. The book was published on December 29, 1958.

To possibly avoid controversy, the Press decided not to stage the usual autograph party hold at the University. Only a few of the initial copies were sold, though the Texas Folklore Society soon purchased 400 copies.

=== Public reception ===
Soon after the book was published, the Chicano Movement started in California. Chicanos there found out about Paredes's book and started to read it. Famous writer and scholar Tomás Rivera was one of these Chicanos who later told Paredes that reading the book made him feel empowered to write. Many of the movement's leaders read it, including Alurista. Some Chicanos even told Paredes through letters that the book was fundamental to the movement.

Due to this positive reception, the book sold well in California and gained recognition. Many scholars wrote that they appreciated the book for its confrontation of misrepresentations of minority cultures in the United States in general. The book was reviewed positively only with a few exceptions. These negative reviews often came from the rangers and those who are affiliated with them. Some family members of the rangers who participated in capturing Cortez voiced their objection to Paredes's claim that Cortez shot the sheriffs in self-defense. There was even legend that the rangers who were then on-duty were so enraged by the book that they decided to hunt down the book's writer themselves.

In 1995, musician Tish Hinojosa wrote a song as a tribute for Paredes. The song's name is "Con Su Pluma en Su Mano" (Spanish for "With His Pen in His Hand")

== Impact and literary criticism ==
In his book Dancing with the Devil (1994), José E. Limón argues that Paredes provided this model of study for future scholars. The book also goes against a trend of Chicano writers to assimilate into the mainstream cultures.

Jonathan Handelman wrote in 2002 that the book benefited a lot of its writers and critics. Besides creating a model of mixing the fiction with the theory in one work of literature, the book also establishes a way for others to discuss the border objectively. Handelman further says that:

"In presenting the legend, the criticism, and the response to both, Paredes essentially opens the field of border criticism by dissecting the roots, the impact, and the significance of border struggle. With His Pistol in His Hand may be about the ballad of Gregorio Cortez. However, the ballad itself is about much more than one man; the ballad speaks of the border oppression of all."

In contrast, Margie Montañez argues in her dissertation that

"What Paredes does not tell us is the different ways these border men deal with injustices beyond open resistance. The masculine, resistant, and sometimes violent responses stood in direct contrast to education, academia, and scholarship."
