= Américo Paredes Center for Cultural Studies =

The Américo Paredes Center for Cultural Studies is a research center focused on the production and distribution of cultural studies research. As part of the University of Texas at Austin, the Center pulls on many different disciplines and departments. The center was founded in 1967 as the Center for Folklore Studies by Americo Paredes, who received a Ph.D. from the UT-Austin English Department in 1956 and joined the faculty in 1958. Scholars historically associated with the center include Richard Bauman and Steven Feld.
