= Américo Paredes =

American writer (1915–1999)

- Born: September 3, 1915; Brownsville, Texas, U.S.
- Died: May 5, 1999 (aged 83); Austin, Texas, U.S.
- Occupations: Folklorist; professor; writer
- Awards: Orden Mexicana del Águila Azteca

Academic background
- Education: Texas Southmost College (AA); University of Texas at Austin (BA, MA, PhD)

Américo Paredes (September 3, 1915 – May 5, 1999) was an American author born in Brownsville, Texas who authored several texts focusing on the border life that existed between the United States and Mexico, particularly around the Rio Grande region of South Texas. His work was heavily influenced by his family history, especially on his father's side whose ancestors had been in the Americas since 1580. His ancestors were sefarditas, or Spanish Jews who had been converted to Christianity, and in 1749—along with José de Escandón—they settled in the lower Rio Grande. The year of Paredes’ birth was the year of the last Texas Mexican Uprising, which was to portend the life Paredes was to lead. Throughout his long career as a journalist, folklorist and professor, Paredes was to bring focus to his Mexican American heritage, and the beauty of those traditions.

== Life and career ==
Americo Paredes was born September 3, 1915, in Brownsville, Texas to Justo Paredes Cisneros and Cleotilde Manzano Paredes. He had eight siblings. Growing up in Brownsville, Texas, Paredes was to experience the double life of American and Mexican culture. Paredes was a lover both of Edgar Rice Burroughs’ Tarzan books and of Mexican poetry—his father composed décimas (a ten line poem with set rhyme scheme). This love of poetry was to hold Paredes in good stead when, at the age of 18, he won a poetry contest sponsored by Trinity College. This award was to gain him the attention of the high school principal, Mr. Irvine, who in turn, expedited his entrance into junior college in 1934. The same year Paredes entered college, an event that would mark his life occurred, the assassination of Cesar Augusto Sandino, about whom, five years later, Paredes would write “A Cesar Augusto Sandino.”

While in his second year of junior college, Paredes was also to write George Washington Gomez: A Mexico-Texan Novel. Although it was not published until 1990, George Washington Gomez is Paredes' most well known work. The novel tells the story of a young man growing up in early 20th-century Jonesville on the River (a fictional city Paredes used to represent the city of Brownsville) and reveals the conflict in identity (as the title name suggests) the young man experiences growing up in an Anglo-Texan environment, particularly with regard to the educational system.

While in college, Paredes worked not only at the local grocery store (where he bought his first guitar from a co-worker), but also as a proofreader and reporter at The Brownsville Herald, a job he kept even after graduation in 1936. In 1940, as World War II began for the Americans, Paredes took a second job with Pan-American Airways overseeing the outfitting of airplanes with fifty-caliber machine guns. Simultaneously, he began playing guitar on the radio, a talent he had taught himself during junior college. As World War II heated up, Paredes was drafted into the army, but even there he was a journalist, reporting for the army publication Stars and Stripes, a publication which—while in Japan—allowed him to interview military leader Hideki Tōjō. Also in Japan, Paredes took correspondence courses from the University of Texas, through an army school, affectionately referred to as the Tokyo College. By 1950, Paredes had moved to Austin to pursue first his master's degree and then his Ph.D. When he returned to the United States, he brought with him his half-Japanese, half-Uruguayan wife Amelia Nagamine, whose visa issues almost stopped his education. By 1951, Paredes was teaching as a graduate student at the University of Texas and drawing attention. In 1952 he would win an award from the Dallas Times Herald for a collection of short stories he had selected from his larger work, The Hammon and The Beans. He called it Border Country. In 1955, he won an award of 500 dollars for his novel The Shadow, although this book would not be published until 1998.

In his graduate school years it would be a twist of fate that would lead Paredes down the road of folklore. While taking English courses during his masters' program, he encountered a text comparing two Scottish ballads, which Paredes was to compare to the Mexican corrido (a comparison that would crop up again in his dissertation of With His Pistol in His Hand). His professor at the time introduced him to Robert Stephenson, then a professor of English teaching folklore, who would persuade him to pursue a future in the field. In 1956, Paredes’ dissertation, which was to turn into his opus With His Pistol in His Hand, told the story of the legendary Gregorio Cortez and his conflict with the Texas Rangers. The text portrayed the famed Texas Rangers in a negative fashion, which was unheard of in the history of that organization. There was a suggestion, jokingly perhaps, by some Texas Rangers that Paredes should be shot in retaliation for his blemishing of the reputation of the Texas Rangers in that book. When With His Pistol in His Hand was completed, it garnered the attention of famous folklorist Stith Thompson, who was to recommend the work to the University of Texas Press for publication in 1958. The book "sold less than 1000 copies by 1965, then exploded into dozens of editions as it became a foundational text and primer for the emerging academic movement of Chicano studies."

The same year With His Pistol in His Hand was published, Paredes was hired by University of Texas, Austin to teach, a decision which would change the face of their curriculum. In the 1960s and 70's Americo Paredes was to join the Chicano movement along with Tomás Rivera and Miguel Méndez. During this same period he would also expand the educational curriculum of UT by founding their Center for Folklore Studies (1967). Paredes would continue on to found their Center for Mexican American Studies as well. In 1989 Paredes would become one of five men to be awarded the Charles Frankel Prize of the National Endowment for the Humanities and in 1991 (the same year his high school and young adult poetry Between Two Worlds would publish) he received the Orden del Aguila Azteca along with Cesar Chavez and Julian Samora.

In 1970, his Folktales of Mexico was published as part of the Folktales of the World series.

On May 5, 1999, Americo Paredes died in Austin, Texas.

Paredes has the distinction of being one of the few scholars "to ever have a corrido...composed in his honor".

== Legacy ==
Places named after him:

- Americo Paredes Elementary School - Brownsville Independent School District
- Americo Paredes Elementary School - La Joya Independent School District
- Americo Paredes Middle School - Austin Independent School District

== Bibliography ==
- 1937 Cantos de adolescencia
- 1958 With His Pistol in His Hand: A Border Ballad and Its Hero
- 1966 Folk Music of Mexico. Book for the Guitar No. 671
- 1970 Folktales of Mexico
- 1976 A Texas-Mexican Cancionero: Folksongs of the Lower Border
- 1990 George Washington Gomez: A Mexico-Texan Novel
- 1991 Between Two Worlds
- 1993 Uncle Remus con chile
- 1993 Folklore and Culture on the Texas-Mexican Border
- 1994 The Hammon and the Beans and Other Stories
- 1998 The Shadow

== External Reading ==
- Américo Paredes Papers - Benson Latin American Collection
- Center for Mexican American Studies Records - Benson Latin American Collection
- Archived online exhibition
