= Gregorio Cortez =

Mexican-American accused of murder

- Born: June 22, 1875; Matamoros, Tamaulipas, Mexico
- Died: February 28, 1916 (aged 40); Anson, Texas, U.S.
- Occupation: Tenant maize farmer
- Spouses: Leonor Diaz; Estefana Garza; Esther Martínez*
- Convictions: Horse theft (50 year sentence), Second-degree murder (life sentence)

Notes
- * = Contested

Gregorio Cortez Lira (June 22, 1875 – February 28, 1916) was born in the state of Tamaulipas, Mexico on June 22, 1875 and became a folk hero to the border communities of the United States and Mexico. After an altercation in which he killed Sheriff W. T. (Brack) Morris, Cortez went on the run from the Texas Rangers for thirteen days. He became the target of the largest manhunt in U.S. history from June 14, 1901 to June 22, 1901. He was accused of murdering two sheriffs and finally convicted of horse theft. Later it was discovered there had been miscommunication. When asked, “if he had sold a horse” Gregorio’s brother responded with “No, I sold a Mare” in Spanish. Gregorio shot the sheriff in self defense after his brother was shot due to miscommunication then went on the run.

Celebrated by fellow Mexican-Americans for his ability to evade the authorities, as well as his impassioned words in court, Cortez's life was converted into a legend by people on the Rio Grande border. This legend, which took shape in a popular song, the "Corrido de Gregorio Cortez," dramatized Cortez's fight against the authorities and transformed him into an inspiration for the Mexican-American border communities. This corrido (or border ballad), sung at local cantinas, resonated with its listeners, and ignited pride in the way of life on the border. The conversion of Cortez into myth was analyzed by Américo Paredes in his book With His Pistol in His Hand, which examines the many versions of this corrido as well as the story's historical basis in order to understand how an average man such as Gregorio Cortez was canonized into a folkloric hero inspiring border residents. Cortez's story was also depicted in the movie The Ballad of Gregorio Cortez, starring Edward James Olmos.

== Background ==
Texas was part of newly independent Mexico from 1821 until 1836 when it declared its independence. The annexation by the United States was approved by the congresses of Texas and the United States in 1845, and the transfer of authority from the republic to the state of Texas took place in 1846. However, Mexico's rejection of this annexation and a disagreement over the location of the new border, namely, a dispute over the area between the Rio Grande and the Nueces River, led to the Mexican-American War. In the Treaty of Guadalupe Hidalgo, signed on February 2, 1848, Mexico gave up its claim to Texas and the new border between Mexico and the United States was settled along the Rio Grande.

The U.S. annexation brought land loss and limitations to political access for Tejanos. The Treaty of Guadalupe Hidalgo promised American citizenship to residents who wanted to stay in Texas, but Tejanos in the lower Rio Grande Valley were relegated to second-class status. Also, while it provided that the property rights of Mexican subjects would be inviolable, these rights were later challenged by the United States authorities. The vast majority of Mexican-Americans also suffered racial discrimination, and cultural, ethnic, and religious differences between Anglos and Hispanics persisted in the decades after the Mexican War. Although the episodes of ethnic violence were episodic, the historian Alonzo argues that "Anglo superiority also served to rationalize the very common idea in Texas that it is no wrong to kill a Mexican and, worse still, that killing an ethnic Mexican was an act to be proud of."

In his book about Gregorio Cortez's life, Américo Paredes highlights the role of the Texas Rangers division in exacerbating the cultural conflicts on the border due to their alleged violent methods. An antagonistic relationship between Anglo-Americans and Mexican-Americans has developed in Texas due to a cycle of revenge involving Bandit Gang, Texas Rangers and innocent Mexican-American collateral victims. However, the role of the Texas Rangers in discrimination is a subject of historical controversy. On the one hand, the Texas Rangers were portrayed as heroic figures protecting settlers from Indian raids and Mexican banditry. On the other hand, they have been described as the main tool of Anglo expansion on lands formerly occupied by Mexicans and Native Americans. To move beyond this dichotomy, historian Robert M. Utley exposes the complex nature of the relationship between the Mexican Americans and the Texas Rangers. While some rangers may have been "ruthless, brutal and more lawless than the criminals they were prosecuting," he argues that there is no systematic evidence of persecution of Mexican-Americans by this police force.

== Early life ==
Gregorio Cortez Lira was born in the state of Tamaulipas, Mexico, near the U.S.-Mexico border, the son of Roman Cortez Garza, a rancher, and Rosalia Lira Cortinas. In 1887, the Cortez family moved to Manor, Texas near Austin. Two years later, Cortez joined his older brother, Romaldo Cortez, in finding seasonal employment on the farms and ranches of South Texas. Eventually, Cortez married Leonor Díaz; they had four children. After eleven years as vaqueros, or cowboys, and farmhands, Cortez and his brother settled on a farm in Karnes County, renting land from a local rancher. It is known that he spoke English and owned horses. Gregorio Cortez and his first wife divorced in 1903, and in 1905 he married Estefana Garza. They had no children and later separated.

At the time that Cortez and his family had immigrated to South Texas, Anglos had also begun to penetrate the region in increasing numbers, particularly with the arrival of the railroad. As political and economic power shifted to the newcomers, most Mexican Americans, like Cortez, lived as hired agricultural workers or as tenant farmers. Class and ethnicity relegated them to the bottom of a discriminatory Anglo-dominated Texas society.

== Adventure of Cortez ==
=== Incident ===
Court records show that the killings of Romaldo (also known as Román) Cortez, Gregorio's brother, and Sheriff W.T. (Brack) Morris were related to the subject of a horse trade. Morris arrived accompanied by one of his deputies, Boone Choate, who could speak Spanish and would thus serve as an interpreter.

Morris and Choate's questioning of Cortez followed their interrogation of Villareal in connection with a reported horse theft. Villareal had already acknowledged his recent trade of a horse for a mare belonging to Gregorio Cortez. And it was exactly this distinction made in Spanish, between a male horse (caballo) and a female horse or mare (yegua), that Choate misunderstood when questioning Gregorio. The latter answered negatively when asked on behalf of the Sheriff whether he had recently traded for a horse. For, in truth, he had traded a mare.

Interpreting the response as a lie, the Sheriff made clear his intention to arrest the Cortez brothers. More words were exchanged and a gun battle followed. The sheriff was the first to draw a pistol despite the suspicion on his part that both Cortezes were probably unarmed. Gregorio killed Sheriff Morris in self-defense after the Sheriff had fired repeatedly on his brother Romaldo who, thinking that Gregorio was unarmed, ran at the Sheriff trying to protect Gregorio.

The Sheriff shot Romaldo and he fell away from the door. Cortez then shot Morris with his pistol. The killing occurred on June 14, 1901.

=== Escape to the Robledo ranch ===
After the run-in with Sheriff Morris and Deputy Boone, Cortez wanted to take his injured brother to the closest town, Kenedy, Texas, for medical assistance about 10 miles away. Both on horseback, Cortez and his brother, Romaldo, struggled on their journey as Romaldo was severely hurt and kept falling off his horse. However, Gregorio eventually reached Kenedy, left Romaldo in town to be taken care of, and began his flight from the authorities.

As officers thought Cortez would be heading south to the border to escape, he decided to head north instead to confuse his pursuers. He traveled 55 miles from Kenedy to Belmont in hopes of hiding at the house of his friend, Martín Robledo. After spending a couple of days at the Robledo ranch, authorities discovered Cortez's whereabouts and thus begun the Battle of Belmont.

=== Battle of Belmont ===
After escaping, Cortez went to the ranch of Martín and Refugia Robledo near Belmont, Texas. There were seven persons at the Robledo house. Martín and Refugia Robledo, their three sons, Ramón Rodríguez (a boy living with the Robledos) and a visitor, Martín Sandoval. Gonzales County Sheriff Robert M. Glover, a friend of Sheriff Morris, knew where Cortez was hiding, probably from information obtained under duress. This information would have been either provided by Cortez's mother, wife or sister-in-law as they were the only people who knew where Cortez was going.

According to the Texas Court of Criminal Appeals report of facts, on June 15, 1904, at the time Sheriff Morris was killed, Sheriff Glover was in Cuero, DeWitt County, Texas. Glover proceeded with a deputy sheriff of De Witt County to Kenedy, in Karnes County, and there for the first time learned that Cortez was the man who had killed Sheriff Morris. Glover, knowing the rendezvous of Cortez, boarded a train in about twenty minutes after receiving the information that Cortez had done the killing and proceeded as expeditiously as he could to the town of Ottine, in Gonzales County; there secured horses, and accompanied by two deputy sheriffs of Gonzales County, including Deputy Swift, and other parties, went a few miles in the country to the Schnable ranch; and there learned that Cortez was at the home of Martin Roblero. He and his posse went to Roblero's. The posse divided as they approached the house from the north side; Glover and one or more companions going on the east side of the house around to the south side; and the other parties going on the west side around to the south side of the house. According to the Court, some of the testimony tends to show that the sheriff's posse shot first; but the preponderance of the evidence shows that Cortez and Bonafacio fired the first shot. Just before the time that the sheriff's posse arrived at the house, Cortez informed Bonafacio that the Sheriff's troop would be on his tail and asked him what he should do, whether to fight or surrender. Bonafacio would have said, "We will fight". Immediately upon Glover getting around to a point opposite the gallery on the south side of the house, Cortez and Bonafacio Roblero (the Roblero's eldest son), who were in the gallery, allegedly fired upon Glover and killed him. There was a general fusillade of shots on the part of the posse and Cortez and Bonafacio. On the other hand, in his testimony, Cortez asserts that the officers came up and immediately fired upon him; that he returned this fire.

The San-Antonio Express called the Battle of Belmont, as it came to be known, “a tale of bravery unsurpassed on the part of the officers and of desperation on the part of the Mexicans.”. According to this version of the story, Cortez was waiting in ambush, and as Sheriff Glover and Posseman Schnabel approached, he opened fire. Sheriff Glover and Posseman Schnabel were killed

The actual story, according to the scholar Américo Paredes, was less heroic. Just hours after Cortez arrived at the ranch, Glover and his posse had surrounded the house and began to attack. Cortez fired at Glover, who fell dead, and Cortez ran into the brush behind the house to hide. Robledo, his eldest son, and Sandoval were involved in the shooting, while Robledo's wife, his two younger sons and Ramón Rodríguez stayed unarmed inside the house. Shots were exchanged and Ramón Rodríguez was wounded, as well as Robledo's wife. Another member of the posse shot and killed accidentally his companion, Henry Schnabel. In the end, the posse captured five of the Mexicans, including the two wounded. Cortez, however, escaped.

=== Flight ===
After narrowly escaping the standoff on the Robledo ranch, Cortez "walked directly south to the banks of the Guadalupe River [...] to another friend, Ceferino Flores." Flores gave Cortez a horse and saddle to continue his journey. Cortez would frequently ride in circles and create paths in different directions to throw off the authorities. After days of travel, the mare grew weary and dropped dead. Soon saddling another small horse, Cortez continued south, just outside of Floresville, close to Cotulla. Though Cortez succeeded in creating disorientating routes for officers to follow, he traveled close to the Corpus Christi-to-Laredo railroad and made it evident that he was moving toward Laredo. As the law was close behind him, Cortez took risks; having his newfound horse jump over sharp wire fences or pretending he was a cattle herder. But on June 20, as the mare could not continue, Cortez left the horse and snuck into Cotulla and received food and new clothes from locals. Cortez did not have a horse and was essentially surrounded by authorities. However, he went unnoticed, authorities believed he had acquired yet another horse, and that their only chance of catching Cortez would be by accident. Over his 10-day journey, Cortez had ridden three horses, traveled over 500 miles, and had seemingly blended in with the townspeople of Cotulla.

During those 10 days, Cortez was pursued by a posse that at times included up to 300 men. He traveled nearly 400 miles on horseback and more than 100 miles on foot. His story was symbolic of the struggles between the Anglo-Americans and Mexican Americans in South Texas.

=== Capture ===
Gregorio managed to elude hundreds of men in parties of up to three hundred by riding four hundred miles on mares and walking at least 120 miles along the Mexico-Texas border before ultimately being captured on June 22.

From June 15 to June 25, 1901, the story was front-page news of the San Antonio Express. Through the newspaper, Cortez, a lone Mexican vaquero, was transformed into a dynamic leader of well-organized thieves. While the Euro-American public viewed Cortez as a guilty Mexican, Mexican-Americans transformed Cortez into a heroic figure that could outrun the renowned Texas Rangers, and stand up to his oppressors.

== Trials ==
=== Court proceedings ===
==== Supporters ====
After the capture of Cortez, before court proceedings would begin, Mexican-Americans across the country started a defense fund for Cortez, saying that without the support it would be impossible for him to get a fair trial. The amount of money raised is unknown, however, the fund was largely advertised by a newspaper publisher, Pablo Cruz, and the Sociedad Trabajador Miguel Hidalgo in San Antonio and saw donations flood in from rich landowners and even local "rancheros". Though Cortez's support was mainly from those of Mexican descent, some Anglo-Americans admired his "intellect, wisdom and ingenuity. Some prominent Anglo-Texans aiding Cortez were then Texas Secretary of State, F.C. Weinert, and defense lawyer, R.B Abernathy, who Cortez remembered as one of his most vital attorneys, defending him for over four years.

==== Gonzales trial ====
The first of Cortez's trials began on July 24, 1901, in Gonzales, Texas. Though many Mexicans were vocal about and attended the trial in Gonzales, the jury consisted of eleven Anglo-Americans and one African-American. At Gonzales, "a gallery full of lawmen filled the courtroom" and wanted to see Cortez sentenced. The prosecution tried Cortez for the murder of Constable Schnabel, one of the men killed at the Battle of Belmont (see above). The prosecution had originally claimed the murder to have been done by Mrs. Robledo during the fight, but they shifted the blame to Cortez and told Robledo to testify that she had seen Cortez shoot and kill both Schnabel and Glover. Another witness, Manuel Tom, strengthened the claim, saying that Cortez had confessed to him about killing the two men near a barn where Robledo described. However, when asked what was the Spanish word for barn (granero) the best Tom could do was say casa, the word for house. The trial swayed all jurors, besides an A.L Sanders who believed Cortez to be innocent. However, as a family member of Sanders's soon developed a serious illness and the juror needed to return home. Sanders succumbed to the jury's pressure and agreed with the others that Cortez was guilty; ultimately sentencing Cortez to 50 years in prison for second-degree murder. Though Sanders later told the defense he voted "guilty" to be there for his sick family member and the attorneys motioned for a new trial, however, their plea was struck down and Sanders was fined $100 for contempt of court.

Many local officers were enraged about the verdict as they wanted to see Cortez face the death penalty. A few months later, as Cortez was in a Gonzales jail, over 300 men arranged a lynching of the recently sentenced prisoner. The attempts were unsuccessful, but tensions grew further as soon thereafter, on January 15, 1902, the Texas Court of Criminal Appeals reversed Cortez's sentence. The appeal was upheld as the court doubted that Cortez could have murdered both officers within quick succession, as he would have been in two places at the same time, and denied Manuel Tom's crude translation of the word barn. The Gonzales trial was ultimately a win for Cortez and his defense team, as he would not be tried for the murder of Schnabel again. However, the prosecution backed by the rage of local police forces continued working to see Cortez serve life behind bars or be sentenced to death.

==== Further legal battles ====
Though Cortez's sentence for the killing of Schnabel was reversed in early 1902, Cortez had faced a previous trial from Oct 7-11, 1901 in Karnes City, Texas and was sentenced to death for the murder of Sheriff Morris. At this trial, "the families of both Morris and Glover were sat in the front row, where the prosecution could point them out to the jury." However, eight months after the Karnes verdict, the Court of Criminal Appeals reversed the sentence on the grounds of prejudice. Legal proceedings transferred to Pleasanton, Texas where a ruling imprisoned Cortez for two years for horse theft. The court ruling was soon reversed.

Cortez's hearings continued to Goliad, Texas where the jury could not agree on a sentence for Cortez with "seven for first-degree murder, four for second-degree murder, and one for acquittal." The trials soon went to Wharton County, where it was dismissed almost immediately, and then to Corpus Christi where Cortez was tried April 25–30, 1904. The jury, consisting of twelve white farmers, found Cortez not guilty for the killing of Morris, saying he acted in self-defense.

However, there was no celebration of the acquittal, as soon thereafter, a court in Columbus, Texas found Cortez guilty for the murder of Sheriff Glover and sentenced him to life in prison. Though the defense was optimistic about their appeal being upheld, Cortez's lawyers had built a case saying that Cortez had not fired shots anywhere near Glover in the Battle of Belmont which many witnesses denied. The Court of Criminal Appeals soon upheld the conviction, and on Jan 1, 1905, Gregorio Cortez began his life sentence in the Huntsville Penitentiary for the murder of Sheriff Glover.

=== Prison and pardon ===
Cortez was sentenced not for the death of Morris (which sparked the entire escapade), but for his alleged murder of Sheriff Robert M. Glover, who was killed during the pursuit. Efforts to have Cortez pardoned began with his incarceration and finally succeeded in 1913 when Governor Oscar Colquitt issued him a conditional pardon. He was freed on July 14 of that year.

== Post-prison life and death ==
After his pardon in 1913, Cortez thanked those who helped secure his freedom, spent his later years in Nuevo Laredo, Mexico, and joined the losing Huertist forces of the Mexican Revolution. After being wounded in the war, Cortez began living with one of his sons in Manor, Texas then later resided in Anson, Texas. Then on February 28, 1916, having been recently married for the third time to an assumed Esther Martínez, Cortez died suddenly at the age of 40.

To this day, the cause of death of Cortez is contested. There are assumptions of natural causes, heart attack, pneumonia, or possible poisoning done unto him by "enemies who did not want to see him free." He was buried eight miles outside of Anson, and as Paredes notes his grave lies approximately "five hundred miles from the Border on which he was born."

== In popular culture ==
=== El Corrido de Gregorio Cortez ===
As Cortez's story spread to Mexican-American settlements across the United States and Mexico, it was transformed into a ballad where he was often revered as a hero of the border Mexican community whose resilience against persecutory law enforcement inspired many. In Américo Paredes's book, With His Pistol in His Hand, he recites eleven versions of El Corrido de Gregorio Cortez each sung by numerous guitarreros (guitarists) near the Mexican-American border. Though each corrido had their own style, flair, or message wanting to be relayed, they all exaggerated the life of Cortez to transform him into a Mexican folk hero.

=== With His Pistol in His Hand ===
The life and legend of Gregorio Cortez were studied by the scholar Américo Paredes in a doctoral thesis on corridos that was later published in a revised version by the University of Texas Press in 1958 under the title With His Pistol in His Hand. Paredes's work is about the life of Cortez, his legend, the formal aspects and variants of the corrido, and the cultural significance reflected in these products.

The book is one of the most influential books in Chicano cultural studies and has received wide recognition and outstanding success in the academic world. The first chapter and the third chapters are historical. In the first one, he retraces the social and political background of the former Spanish province of Nuevo Santander to explain the origin of ethnic tensions. In the third chapter, through extensive corpus sources (judicial reports, newspapers, and testimonies) he reconstructs in detail the whole life of Cortez. The second chapter could be classified as a study of regional folklore because he describes "an idealized and formalized version of the legend." In the second part of the book "El Corrido de Gregorio Cortez, a Ballad of Border Conflict,” Paredes provides a study of the narrative form of the corrido. This part integrates elements of sociolinguistics, through an analysis of the choice of words and the mixing of English and Spanish, anthropology, through an ethnographic description of the border culture, ethnomusicology with a study of the different variants of Gregorio Cortez's Ballad and their meanings

=== In film ===
The legend was turned into the film The Ballad of Gregorio Cortez, starring Edward James Olmos, in 1982. It was directed by Robert Young, and based on Paredes's With His Pistol in His Hand. The film deals with the creation of the myth as well as the reconstruction of the historical reality of the life and adventure of Gregorio Cortez.

The film is classified as a Western, but it is different from other films of the genre due to its historical realism. While classic elements of a western are present in the film such as horse racing, a lynch mob, a heroic sheriff and the vast desert space of Texas, the film's authenticity is a profound departure from this genre. The magazine Cinéaste described the film as "the true history of the West". and the movie has been considered the most authentic Westerns in the history of American cinema by the United States Historical Society. This sense of authenticity is due in part to the documentary style used by the director to tell the life of Gregorio Cortez, but also to the choice made by Villasenor to develop the point of view of the people involved in the story, regardless of their ethnicity, thus presenting real historical characters and not the stereotypes of a myth. This process makes it possible to represent the hostility between communities in South Texas and the violation of the land rights of Mexican Americans by Texas Rangers or lynch mobs. On the other hand, through this process, the scriptwriters were able to highlight the origins of the myth as well as the stages of its construction. The myth is presented as an episode in the history of the conflict between the Anglo-Americans and The Mexican-Americans.

In an interview, the film's director, Robert Young, suggested that he wanted to represent the different interpretations surrounding life and legend. He declared "I thought the important thing was, first, to tell a story that wasn't linear- I don't believe in those kinds of stories, things are always more complicated - and then to deal with the differing interpretations." Young wanted to represent the fantasies created by the two ethnic groups, namely the exaggeration of Cortez's exploits for the Mexicans and the belief that Cortez was at the head of an entire gang for the Anglos. He declared to Cinéaste that he "tried to take the audience into the story so they would make the same mistakes as the Anglos and, later, when they find out what happened, they wouldn't feel superior to the Anglo characters but realize that they'd made the same error".

If racism is portrayed throughout the film, the director downplays it. It was a deliberate choice to keep the humanity of the characters and to denounce it more vigorously. According to Young, "The people who perpetuate the racism are people, too, they're human. If you go too heavy on the racism, it makes it difficult to see them as people."

=== Con Su Pistola en La Mano ===
Cortez's story was adapted into a concept EP by black metal band Maquahuitl, titled Con Su Pistola en La Mano. The EP was released to streaming service Bandcamp on January 1, 2021, and was described as "a concept release going through the journey of Mexican outlaw Gregorio Cortez who evaded 300 Texas Rangers after killing 2 Sheriffs in self-defense. Becoming a local folk hero and legend in the Tejano/ Mexico border area."

== See also ==
- Juan Cortina
- Joaquin Murietta
- Tiburcio Vasquez
- Manifest Destiny

== Sources ==
- Alonzo, A. C. (1998), Tejano Legacy: Rancheros and Settlers in South Texas, 1734-1900, Albuquerque: University of New Mexico Press.
- Alvear, Christina Lynn (2006), Crossing Country and County Borders: The Cortez Family's Movement North from Northern Mexico to South and Central Texas; 1851-1901, The University of Texas at El Paso. Masters Thesis.
- Arteaga, Alfred (1985), "The Chicano-Mexican Corrido", The Journal of Ethnic Studies, 13 (2): 75–105, ProQuest 1300561467
- Brown, Gary (2001), Singin' a Lonesome Song: Texas Prison Tales, Republic of Texas Press, ISBN 978-1-55622-845-2.
- Campbell, Randolf B. (2003), Gone to Texas: A History of the Lone Star State, Oxford: Oxford University Press, ISBN 9780195138436.
- Elitzik, Paul (1984), "The Ballad of Gregorio Cortez", Cineaste, 13 (4): 38 & 40–41.
- Jastrzembski, Joseph C. (2000), "Cortez Lira, Gregorio", American National Biography, Oxford University Press, doi:10.1093/anb/9780198606697.article.0600875, ISBN 978-0-19-860669-7.
- Levario, Miguel A. (2012), Militarizing the Border: When Mexicans Became the Enemy, College Station, TX: Texas A&M University Press.
- Orozco, Cynthia, "Cortez Lira, Gregorio", Handbook of Texas, Texas State Historical Association.
- Paredes, Américo (2016) [1958], With His Pistol In His Hand: A Border Ballad and Its Hero, Austin, TX: University of Texas Press, ISBN 978-0-292-70128-1.
- Rodríguez, Juan Carlos, "El Corrido de Gregorio Cortez", Handbook of Texas, Texas State Historical Association.
- Sandlin, Michael (2018), "The Ballad of Gregorio Cortez", Cineaste, 44 (1): 64–65, JSTOR 26563073
- Seal, Graham (2009). "The Robin Hood Principle: Folklore, History, and the Social Bandit". Journal of Folklore Research. 46 (1): 67–89. doi:10.2979/jfr.2009.46.1.67. JSTOR 40206940. S2CID 144567050.
- Sommer, Doris (1999). Proceed with Caution, When Engaged by Minority Writing in the Americas. Cambridge, MA: Harvard University Press.
- Sommer, Doris (1993), "Cortez in the Courts: The Traps of Translation from Newsprint to Film", in Garber, Margorie B.; Matlock, Jann; Walkowitz, Rebecca (eds.), Media Spectacles, New York: Routledge, pp. 91–116, ISBN 9780415907514.
- Sorell, Victor A. (1983), "Ethnomusicology, Folklore, and the History in the Filmmaker's Art: The Ballad of Gregorio Cortez", Bilingual Review/La Revista Bilingüe, 10 (2/3): 153–158, JSTOR 25744069.
- Sunness, Sheldon (1984), "The Ballad of Gregorio Cortez: An Interview with Robert Young", Cinéaste, 13 (4): 39–40, JSTOR 41692563.
- Utley, Robert M. (2007), Lone Star Lawmen: The Second Century of the Texas Rangers, Oxford: Oxford University Press, ISBN 978-0425219386.
- Weiss, Harold J. Jr. (2012), "Texas Rangers Revisited: Old Themes and New Viewpoints", in Glasrud, Bruce A.; Weiss, Harold J. Jr. (eds.), Tracking the Texas Rangers: The Nineteenth Century, Denton: University of North Texas Press, pp. 24–49.
