= Julian Samora =

Latino Studies scholar and sociology professor (1920-1996)

Dr. Julian Samora (March 1, 1920 – February 2, 1996) was an American teacher, scholar and community activist who helped to pioneer the field of Latino Studies. Samora was the first Mexican-American to ever receive a doctorate in sociology; and, by the end of his academic career, he was named Professor Emeritus at the University of Notre Dame. He received numerous honors across his career, including the order of the Aztec Eagle, the highest honor Mexico bestows on non-Mexican citizens.

== Activism ==
Samora is noted as an activist scholar in the Mexican-American community who fought for social justice for himself and his fellow Mexican-Americans. Speaking about his social justice activism he said “I think the thing that has gotten me going is discrimination. I tried to be equal to, and as good as, the Anglos. I wanted to make as much money, speak as well, and have all the goodies as the dominant society. But no matter what I did, I was always a ‘Mexican’.“

He was forced to repeat the first grade without the benefit of testing because Spanish was his first language. All Spanish-speaking students were forced to repeat the first grade, presumably to gain sufficient skills in English to succeed in school. When Samora was cast as the lead in the high school play, Anglo cast members threatened to quit so the teacher deferred to them. When asked how he felt about this discriminatory event he said, “Oh, it hurt so much.” He ran for student body president his senior year in college and lost by one vote. His roommate had cast the deciding vote against him. Years later, Julian quoted his roommate as saying, “Well Julian, I couldn’t vote for a Mexican.”

All the Spanish-speaking men he knew were laborers. He had no one to model how to reach his goal as no one in his family had finished high school much less college. It was remarkable that he graduated high school. In 1938, along with 582 other Colorado students, Julian applied for the Frederick G. Bonfils Foundation scholarship, sponsored by the Bonfils family who owned the Denver Post. Julian was one of twenty-nine students that were selected, allowing him to go to Adams State Teacher's College in Alamosa, Colorado where he graduated in 1942 with a degree in history and political science.

When he traveled to Fort Collins, Colorado, to interview for graduate school, he was turned away from lodging by signs that read “No Dogs, Indians or Mexicans Allowed.” He was finally admitted to a fifth-rate hotel by the owner who mistook him for a traveler from India.

== Marriage ==
In November 1942, he married Betty Archuleta. She provided him with an extended family, became his most ardent cheerleader, raised their five children, created an open house atmosphere of hospitality wherever they lived, from the humble Quonset hut student housing in Madison, Wisconsin to the palatial house on Avenida Reforma in Mexico City, which was staffed with servants (much to their great embarrassment).

== Career ==
His first post doctorate position was teaching in the University of Colorado School of Medicine in 1955, a position for which his lifelong colleague and friend, Lyle Saunders, recommended him. Dr. Samora was an assistant professor of Preventive Medicine and Public Health. Noticing that Anglo doctors did not understand or connect with their Mexican-American patients, Dr. Samora undertook a study on the medical delivery systems of Mexican-Americans in Colorado. The study and the resulting papers and presentations of his ideas in his classes helped develop the field of medical anthropology. Dr. Samora took his observations back to the classroom and through his lectures the medical students developed sensitivity toward their Spanish-speaking patients. He taught sociology and anthropology at Michigan State University for two years in 1957 and 1958. While in East Lansing he volunteered with the St. Vincent de Paul Society, as was his custom in every community in which he lived, getting to know the community of working-class Mexican-Americans and helping to reduce their struggle in whatever way he could. Dr. Samora became a national figure in his field and helped found national organizations, but it needs to be noted that his area of concern was born from the personal and local.

In 1959 he was hired with tenure at the University of Notre Dame where he taught until his retirement in 1985. He launched himself headlong into research of Mexican-Americans in many settings and many areas of concern. Among them, rural populations in urban settings, medical delivery systems, educational status of youth and adults, movement of people along the U.S.-Mexico border, Mexican-Americans in the Southwest and in the Midwest, rural poor, urban working-class people and Mexican immigration.

During his career he served on the board of or was a consultant to the following:

- U.S. Commission on Civil Rights
- U.S. Public Health Service
- Rosenberg Foundation
- National Endowment for the Humanities
- National Institute of Mental Health
- Weatherhead Foundation
- U.S. Human Resources Corporation
- Harcourt Brace Jovanovich, Inc.
- Bureau of Census
- U.S. Department of Labor
- National Science Foundation
- WK Kellogg Foundation
- Colorado Anti-Discrimination Commission
- National Upward Bound
- President's Commission on Rural Poverty
- President's Commission on Income Maintenance Program
- Indiana Civil Rights Commission
- Mexican-American Legal Defense & Education Fund
- National Assessment of Educational Progress
- National Advisory Committee to the Bureau of the Census
- National Advisory Committee to Immigration and Citizenship Conference
- National Advisory Committee to U.S.-Mexican Border Research Program
- National Advisory Committee to Harvard Encyclopedia of American Ethnic Groups
- Committee on Opportunities in Science
- American Association for the Advancement of Science
- Council on Foundations
- University of Notre Dame Press and the Allocations Committee for United Way

He was co-founder, with Ernesto Galarza and Herman Gallegos, of the Southwest (now National) Council of La Raza, and was instrumental in the founding of the Mexican-American Legal Defense and Education Fund.

His greatest accomplishment, he told an interviewer, was his Mexican-American Graduate Studies Program at Notre Dame, which was funded by a grant from the Ford Foundation in 1971. He served as mentor and trainer of at least fifty-seven students who went through the program from 1971 to 1985, most of them graduating with advanced degrees in law, political science, psychology, history, government, sociology and economics. These men and woman are his legacy of scholarship and the pursuit of social justice.

=== Retirement ===
Samora retired from the University of Notre Dame in 1985. In 1989, Michigan State University founded the first major university research center named for a Latino, the Julian Samora Research Institute. Dr. Samora is quoted as saying, “As I told the gathering, it’s about time a major university established a research center for Latinos; that it bears my name is very emotional to me.” In 1990, the Mexican government granted Professor Samora El Orden del Aguila Azteca (Aztec Eagle Award). It is the highest award Mexico gives to non-Mexicans.

=== Death ===
In 1989 he started showing signs of a puzzling illness. It was misdiagnosed as Parkinson’s disease until the fall of 1995. When he received the news that he had progressive supranuclear palsy, a terminal neurological disorder, he thanked the neurologist, Dr. Neal Hermanowicz, for telling him what was wrong, for there was relief in finally having the correct diagnosis, and then he cried. He died February 2, 1996, in Albuquerque, New Mexico on the 148th anniversary of the signing of the Treaty of Guadalupe Hidalgo.
