= Edward James Olmos =

American actor (born 1947)

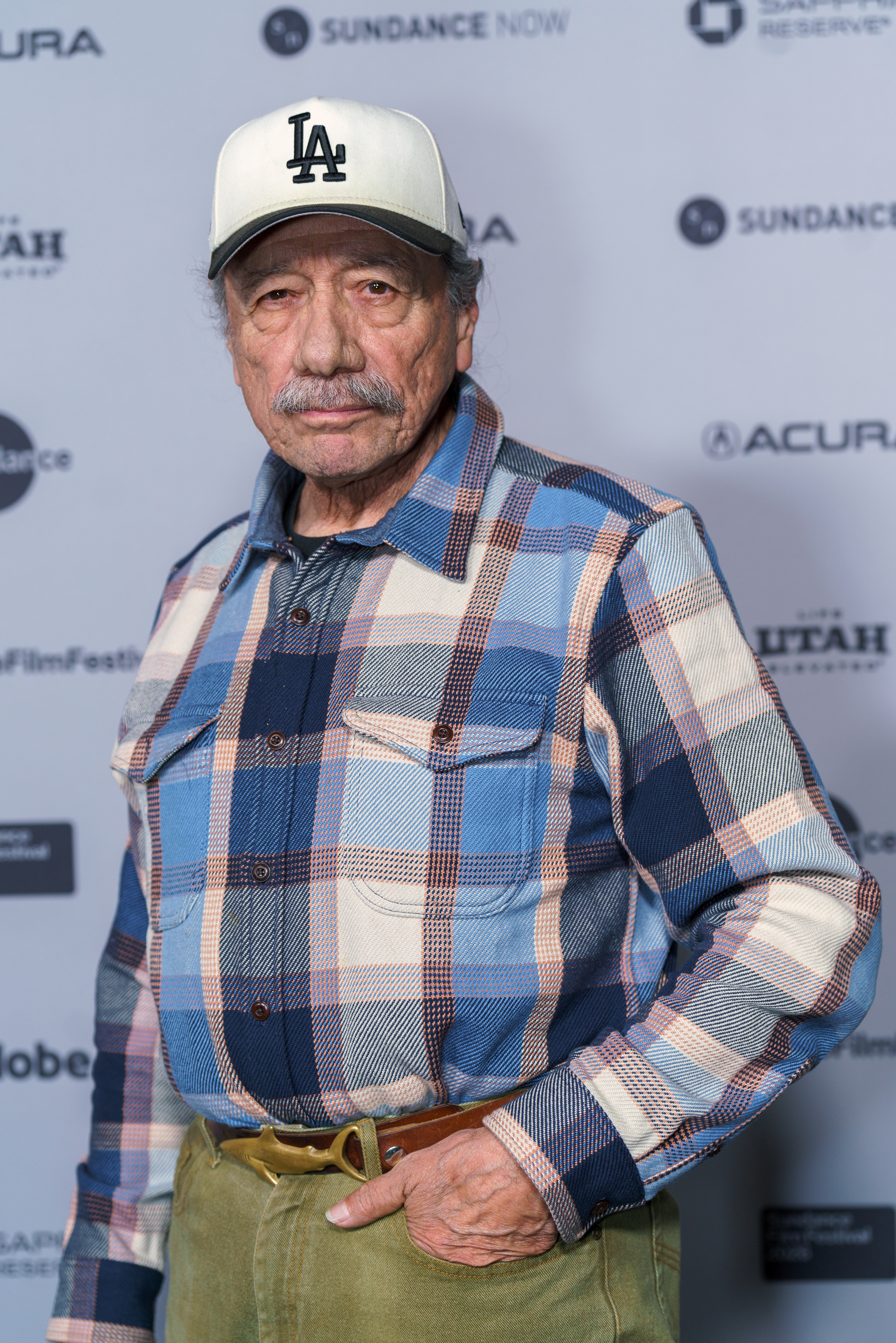
- Olmos at the 2026 Sundance Film Festival
- Born: Edward Huizar Olmos; February 24, 1947 (age 79); East Los Angeles, California, U.S.
- Citizenship: United States; Mexico
- Occupations: Actor; director; producer; activist; journalist
- Years active: 1974–present
- Spouses: Kaija Keel (m. 1971; div. 1992) Lorraine Bracco (m. 1994; div. 2002) Lymari Nadal (m. 2002; sep. 2013)
- Children: 6

Edward James Olmos (born February 24, 1947) is an American actor and director. He is best known for his roles as Detective Gaff in Blade Runner (1982) and its sequel Blade Runner 2049 (2017), Lieutenant Martin "Marty" Castillo in Miami Vice (1984–1989), high school math teacher Jaime Escalante in Stand and Deliver (1988), Montoya Santana in American Me (1992) (which he also directed), and William Adama in the reimagined Battlestar Galactica (2004–2009).

For his work in Miami Vice, Olmos won the 1985 Primetime Emmy Award for Outstanding Supporting Actor in a Drama Series, as well as the Golden Globe Award for Best Supporting Actor – Series, Miniseries or Television Film. For his performance in Stand and Deliver, Olmos was nominated for an Academy Award for Best Actor and a Golden Globe Award for Best Actor in a Motion Picture – Drama.

He is also known for his roles as folk hero Gregorio Cortez in The Ballad of Gregorio Cortez, patriarch Abraham Quintanilla in the film Selena, Felipe Reyes in Mayans M.C., the voice of Chief Tannabok in The Road to El Dorado, narrator El Pachuco in both the stage and film versions of Zoot Suit, and the voice of Chicharrón in Coco.

Over the course of his career, Olmos has been a pioneer for more diversified roles and images of Latinos in American media. His other notable direction, production, and starring roles for films, made-for-TV movies, and TV shows include Battlestar Galactica, Wolfen, Triumph of the Spirit, Talent for the Game, American Me, The Burning Season, My Family, Caught, 12 Angry Men, The Disappearance of Garcia Lorca, Walkout, The Wonderful Ice Cream Suit, American Family, and Dexter.

== Early life ==
Olmos was born and raised in East Los Angeles, California, the son of Mary Eleanor Huizar Flores Magán and Pedro Olmos Escamilla, who was a welder and mail carrier. His mother was born in Los Angeles of Tejano ancestry, who gave birth to Olmos' older brother in Mexico City out of wedlock at the age of 17 in 1944. There she married Olmos' father, Pedro, 2 months later. In 1945, Eleanor returned with Olmos' brother to Los Angeles. Pedro, who was Mexican-born, followed her by train to America, the day WWII ended. Pedro was naturalized as a US citizen in 1953.

Olmos was raised by his American Baptist maternal great-grandparents as his parents worked. He describes his mother as "feisty," and throughout her life performed as a taxi-driver, sheriff, electrical engineer, and nurse (the first woman to walk into the LA General AIDS ward). His great-grandfather was a church custodian. Around the age of seven, his parents divorced. Following the divorce, he primarily lived with his mother and great-grandparents, seeing his father every other Sunday for 8 hours and during the summer for 2 weeks. His father attempted to raise him and his siblings under the Catholic faith and introduced him to cinema at the Egyptian, Chinese Theatre, El Capitan, and Paramount after church services. During the summer, his father would introduce him to dance and television around the age of 9 or 10.

Olmos describes his community growing up as a "salad" of many separate ethnicities, rather than a melting pot. In the midst of early LA gangs, he focused on learning to play baseball as an exercise in discipline. Having won the California state batting championship 2 years in a row, he was collected by the Los Angeles Dodgers' farm system, as a catcher, at age 13. He left baseball at age 15 to join a rock and roll band, which caused a rift with his father, who was hurt by the decision.

He graduated from Montebello High School in 1964. While there, he lost a race for Student Body President to future California Democratic Party Chair Art Torres. In his teen years, he was the lead singer for a psychedelic/hard rock band he named Pacific Ocean, so called because it was to be "the biggest thing on the West Coast". At the same time, he attended classes at East Los Angeles College, including courses in acting, though says he had difficulty due to undiagnosed dyslexia.

For several years, Pacific Ocean (later renamed Eddie James and The Pacific Ocean) performed at various clubs in and around Los Angeles, and released the album Purgatory via VMC Records in late 1968. The album was promoted with two singles, "I Can't Stand It" / "I Wanna Testify", and "My Shrink"/"16 Tons," and was followed by a nation-wide tour in early 1969. While setting up for a Pacific Ocean show one night, Olmos slipped on stage and landed on a nail that went through his knee. Another time during a concert, Olmos jumped from the top of an organ across the stage into the drum set, getting knocked unconscious and dislocating the drummer's shoulder.

== Career ==
=== Theater ===
In the late 1960s and the early 1970s, Olmos branched out from music into acting, appearing in many small productions, until his big break portraying the narrator, called "El Pachuco", in the Luis Valdez play Zoot Suit, which dramatized the World War II-era rioting in California brought about by the tensions between Mexican-Americans and local police, called the Zoot Suit riots. The play moved to Broadway, and Olmos earned a Tony Award nomination. He subsequently took the role to the filmed version in 1981, and appeared in many other films including Wolfen, Blade Runner and The Ballad of Gregorio Cortez. Olmos has been a frequent guest narrator at Disney's Candlelight Processional at Walt Disney World, narrating the nativity story.

=== Film and television ===
In 1980, Olmos was cast in the post-apocalyptic science fiction film Virus (復活の日 Fukkatsu no Hi), directed by Kinji Fukasaku and based on a novel written by Sakyo Komatsu. His role required him to play a piano while singing a Spanish ballad during the later part of the film. Although not a box office success, Virus was notable for being the most expensive Japanese film made at the time.

From 1984 to 1989, he starred in his biggest role up to that date as the taciturn police Lieutenant Martin Castillo in the television series Miami Vice, opposite Don Johnson and Philip Michael Thomas, for which he was awarded a Golden Globe and an Emmy in 1985. At this time, Olmos also starred in a short training video for the United States Postal Service entitled Was it Worth It?, a video about theft in the workplace.

Olmos was the first choice of director Leonard Nimoy for the role of Commander Kruge, the Klingon villain of Star Trek III: The Search for Spock (1984), but the role was given to Christopher Lloyd. Olmos was later contacted about playing the captain of the USS Enterprise (NCC-1701-D) on television's Star Trek: The Next Generation when it was in pre-production in 1986, but declined.

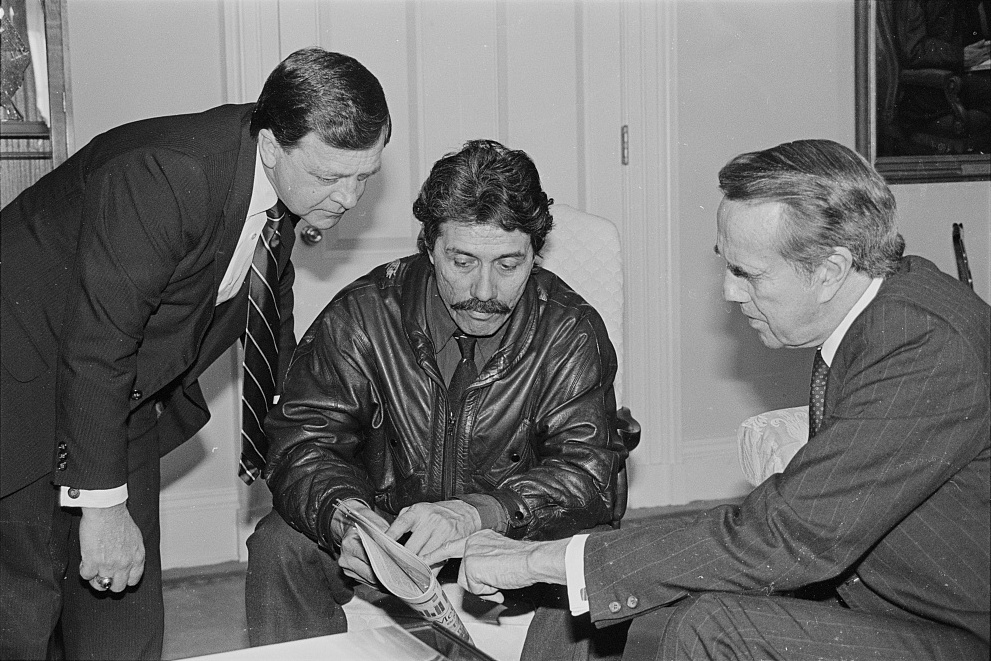
Olmos (center) with Bob Dole, 1992

Returning to film, Olmos became the first American-born Hispanic to receive an Academy Award nomination for Best Actor for his portrayal of real-life math teacher Jaime Escalante in Stand and Deliver. He directed and starred in the controversial crime film American Me in 1992, and also starred in My Family, a multi-generational story of a Chicano family. He had a slight appearance in the video of the American rock band Toto, "I Will Remember" (1995), where he can be seen with actor Miguel Ferrer. In 1997, he starred alongside Jennifer Lopez in the film Selena. Olmos played Dominican Republic dictator Rafael Trujillo in the 2001 film In the Time of the Butterflies. He had a recurring role as U.S. Supreme Court Justice Roberto Mendoza in the NBC drama The West Wing. From 2002 to 2004, he starred as a recently widowed father of a Hispanic family in the PBS drama American Family: Journey of Dreams.

From 2003 to 2009, he starred as Commander William Adama in the Sci-Fi Channel's reimagined Battlestar Galactica miniseries, and in the television series that followed. He directed four episodes of the show, "Tigh Me Up, Tigh Me Down" (1.9), "Taking a Break from All Your Worries" (3.13), "Escape Velocity" (4.4), and "Islanded in a Stream of Stars" (4.18). He directed a television film based upon the show, The Plan. Regarding his work on the show, he told CraveOnline, "I'm very grateful for the work that I've been able to do in my life, but I can honestly tell you, this is the best usage of television I've ever been a part of to date."

In 2005, he provided the voice of Mito in the English dub of Nausicaä of the Valley of the Wind.

In 2006, he co-produced, directed, and played the bit part of Julian Nava in the HBO film about the 1968 Chicano Blowouts, Walkout. He appeared in Snoop Dogg's music video "Vato". In the series finale of the ABC sitcom George Lopez, titled "George Decides to Sta-Local Where It's Familia"; he guest-starred as the plant's new multi-millionaire owner. He has been a spokesperson for Farmers Insurance Group, starring in their Spanish language commercials.

Olmos joined the cast of the television series Dexter for its sixth season, as a "brilliant, charismatic professor of religious studies".

Olmos starred in the second season of Agents of S.H.I.E.L.D. as Robert Gonzales, the leader of a rival faction of S.H.I.E.L.D., for five episodes.

Edward James Olmos reunited with Jennifer Lopez to play father and daughter in the 2026 Netflix romantic comedy Office Romance, nearly 30 years after their iconic roles in Selena.

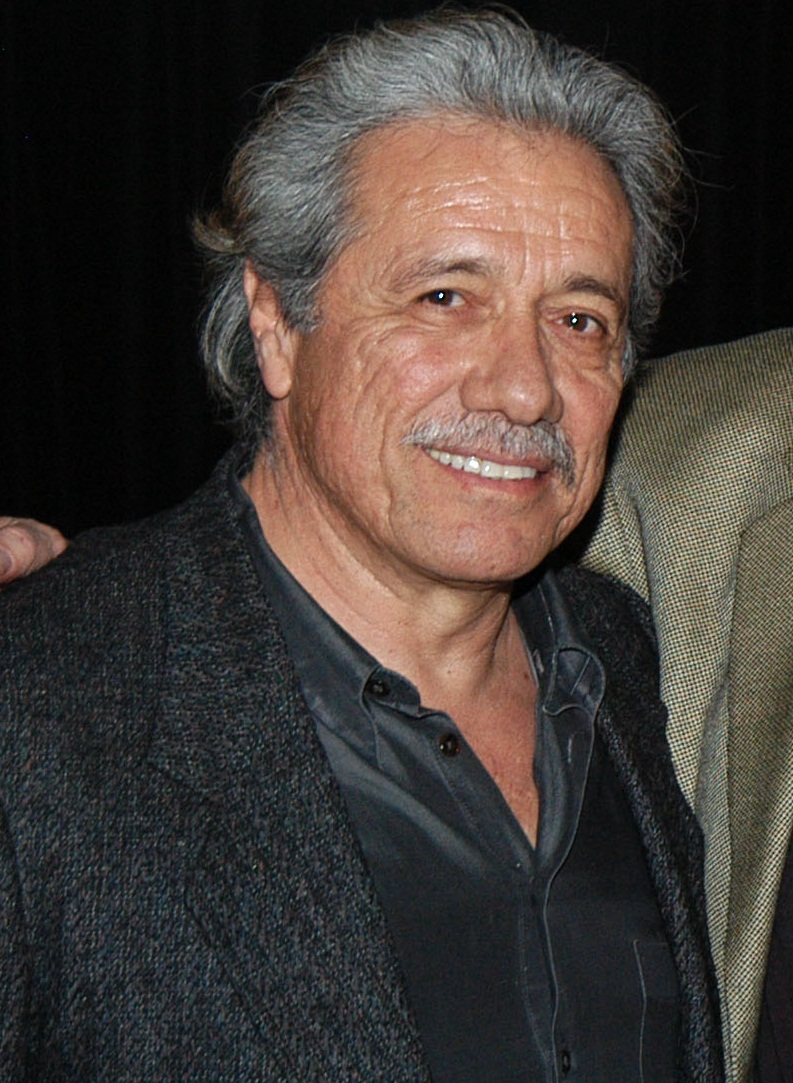
Olmos in 2008

=== Music ===
In 1967, Olmos – as Eddie James (vocals, keyboards) – formed the bluesy psyche rock band that would become Pacific Ocean, who the following year released their only album, Purgatory.

In 1972, he contributed backing vocals to the final song on Todd Rundgren's Something/Anything? album.

== Social and political activism ==
Olmos has often been involved in social activism, especially that affecting the U.S. Hispanic community. During the 1992 Los Angeles riots, Olmos went out with a broom and worked to get communities cleaned up and rebuilt. He also attended an episode of The Oprah Winfrey Show relating to the L.A. riots as an audience member. In 1997, he co-founded the Los Angeles Latino International Film Festival with Marlene Dermer, George Hernandez and Kirk Whisler. That same year, he co-founded with Kirk Whisler the non-profit organization, Latino Literacy Now, that has produced Latino Book & Festivals around the US, attended by over 700,000 people.

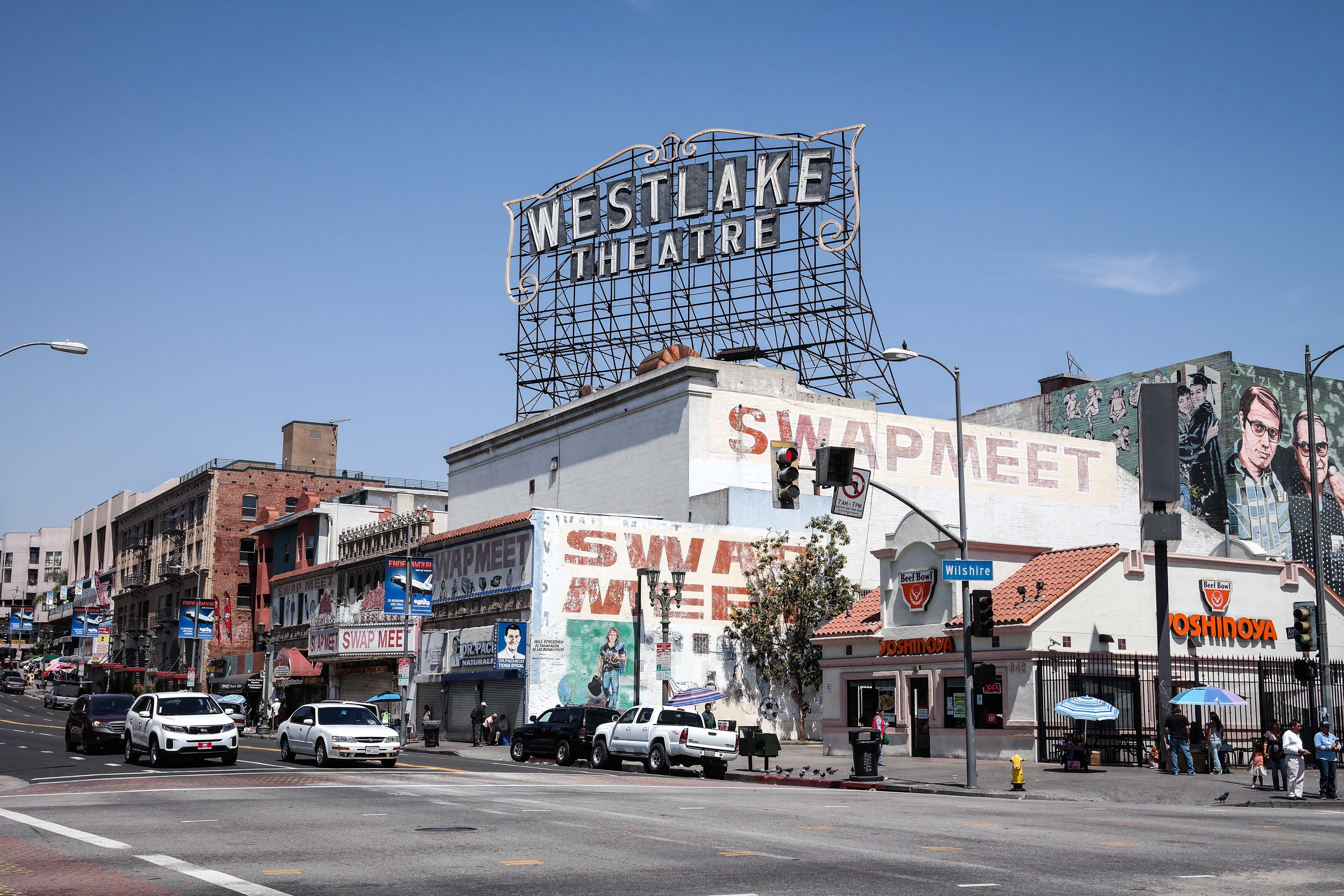
Westlake Theatre building, side wall mural of Jaime Escalante and Edward James Olmos

In 1998, he founded Latino Public Broadcasting and serves as its chairman. Latino Public Broadcasting funds public television programming that focuses on issues affecting Hispanics and advocates for diverse perspectives in public television. That same year, he starred in The Wonderful Ice Cream Suit. In 1999, Olmos was one of the driving forces that created Americanos: Latino Life in the U.S., a book project featuring over 30 award-winning photographers, later turned into a Smithsonian traveling exhibition, music CD and HBO special.

He also makes frequent appearances at juvenile halls and detention centers to speak to at-risk teenagers. He has also been an international ambassador for UNICEF. In 2001, he was arrested and spent 20 days in jail for taking part in the Navy-Vieques protests against United States Navy target practice bombings of the island of Vieques, Puerto Rico. On January 5, 2007, he blamed the United States government for not cleaning Vieques after the U.S. Navy stopped using the island for bombing practice.

Olmos narrated the 1999 documentary film Zapatista, in support of the Zapatista Army of National Liberation, a revolutionary group that has abstained from using weapons since 1994. He gave $2,300 to New Mexico governor Bill Richardson for his presidential campaign (the maximum amount for the primaries). In 2020, he supported Joe Biden for President.

Olmos has also vocally supported various animal rights causes over the years. In 2015 Olmos contributed his voice to the Unity (film), which calls for a transformation in humanity's treatment of animals and the natural world. Since 2015, Olmos has been a vegan. He has worked with PETA on a number of campaigns (such as in radio and TV ads calling for humans to keep their pets indoors during fireworks, and voicing the Coyote in their "Council of Animals" sculpture) and in September 2023 was awarded a Humanitarian Award by the organization.

He is a supporter of SENS Research Foundation, a nonprofit organization dedicated to treating and curing diseases of aging by repairing the underlying damage caused by aging. He narrated a series of animations explaining the concept of SENS.

== Personal life ==
From 1979 to 1987, Olmos lived in West New York, New Jersey. In 1971, he married Kaija Keel, the daughter of actor Howard Keel. They had two children, Bodie and Mico, before divorcing in 1992. Olmos has four adopted children: Daniela, Michael, Brandon, and Tamiko. He married actress Lorraine Bracco in 1994. She filed for divorce in January 2002 after five years of separation. Olmos had a long-term relationship with actress Lymari Nadal. They married in 2002, and separated in 2013.

In 1993, Olmos was awarded an honorary Doctor of Humane Letters (L.H.D.) degree from Whittier College.

In 1996, he was awarded an honorary Doctorate of Fine Arts from California State University, Fresno. In 2007, after a seven-year process, he obtained Mexican nationality. Asteroid 5608 Olmos is named in his honor.

In 2022, Olmos was diagnosed with throat cancer and immediately went into chemotherapy for treatment. By the end of the year, the cancer went into remission. This was not made public until May 2023.

=== Sexual assault accusations ===
In 1992, a 14 year-old girl accused Olmos of twice touching her in a sexual manner while they watched TV and flirted. Olmos admitted watching movies with the 14 year-girl alone in his bedroom, but denied having ever touched her, except on occasions when he said he might have put “suntan lotion” on her “back.” Olmos paid the family a cash settlement of $150,000 in response to the allegations, but denied that they were true. He claimed that the settlement was "meant" to protect his son, Bodie Olmos, not him, due to his son having a relationship with the girl at the time.

In 1997, a woman accused Olmos of sexually assaulting her in a South Carolina hotel room.

== Filmography ==
=== Film ===
Year	Title	Role	Notes
1974	Black Fist	Junkie in Bathroom	Uncredited
1975	Aloha Bobby and Rose	Chicano #1	Credited as Eddie Olmos
1977	Alambrista!	Drunk	
1980	Fukkatsu no hi	Capt. Lopez	
1981	Wolfen	Eddie Holt	
1981	Zoot Suit	El Pachuco	
1982	Blade Runner	Gaff	
1982	The Ballad of Gregorio Cortez	Gregorio Cortez	
1985	Saving Grace	Ciolino	
1988	Stand and Deliver	Jaime Escalante	
1989	The Fortunate Pilgrim	Frank Corbo	
1989	Triumph of the Spirit	Gypsy	
1991	Talent for the Game	Virgil Sweet	
1992	American Me	Montoya Santana	Also director
1993	Roosters	Gallo Morales	
1993	Even Cowgirls Get the Blues	Musician at Barbecue	
1994	A Million to Juan	Angel	
1995	Mirage	Matteo Juarez	
1995	My Family	Paco	
1996	Dead Man's Walk	Capt. Salazar	
1996	Caught	Joe	
1997	Selena	Abraham Quintanilla	
1997	The Disappearance of Garcia Lorca	Roberto Lozano	
1997	Hollywood Confidential	Stan Navarro, Sr.	
1998	The Wonderful Ice Cream Suit	Vamanos	
2000	The Road to El Dorado	Chief Tannabok	Voice
2000	Gossip	Detective Curtis	
2002	Jack and Marilyn	Pasquel	Also director
2005	Cerca, La	Nino	
2005	Nausicaä of the Valley of the Wind	Mito	Voice, English dub
2006	Splinter	Capt. Garcia	
2008	Beverly Hills Chihuahua	Diablo	Voice
2010	I'm Still Here	Himself	
2011	The Green Hornet	Michael Axford	
2011	America	Mr. Irving	
2012	Filly Brown	Leandro	Also producer
2013	Go for Sisters	Freddy Suarez	
2013	2 Guns	Papa Greco	
2014	Unity	Narrator	Documentary
2016	El Americano: The Movie	Gayo "El Jefe"	Voice; Also producer
2016	Monday Nights at Seven	Charlie	Also producer
2017	Blade Runner Black Out 2022	Gaff	Voice, short film
2017	Blade Runner 2049	Gaff	Cameo
2017	Coco	Chicharrón	Voice
2018	Imprisoned	Hospicio	
2019	A Dog's Way Home	Axel	
2019	Windows on the World	Balthazar	
2019	The Devil Has a Name	Santiago	Also director
2020	Chasing Wonders	Luis	
2021	Walking with Herb	Joe	
2024	Outlaw Posse	Ossie	
2024	One Fast Move	Abel	
2026	Office Romance	Captain Jack Cruz	

=== Television ===
Year	Title	Role	Notes
1974	Cannon	Unnamed character	Episode: "The Exchange"; credited as Edward Olmos
1975	Kojak	Bartender	Episode: "How Cruel the Frost, How Bright the Stars"; uncredited
1977	Hawaii Five-O	Dancer	Episode: "Ready, Aim..."
1977	Starsky & Hutch	Julio Guiterez	Episode: "The Psychic"
1978	CHiPs	Henry	Episode: "Flashback"
1978	Evening in Byzantium	Angelo	Television film
1981	Three Hundred Miles for Stephanie	Art Vela	Television film
1982	Hill Street Blues	Joe Bustamonte	2 episodes
1984	Hill Street Blues	Judge Cruz	Episode: "Parting Is Such a Sweet Sorrow"
1984–1990	Miami Vice	Lt. Martin Castillo	106 episodes; also director
1988	The Fortunate Pilgrim	Frank Corbo	3 episodes
1990	The Earth Day Special	Hospital Director	Television special
1994	Menendez: A Killing in Beverly Hills	Jose Menendez	Television film
1994	The Burning Season	Wilson Pinheiro	Television film
1995	The Magic School Bus	Mr. Ramon	Voice, episode: "Going Batty"
1996	The Limbic Region	Jon Lucca	Television film
1996	Dead Man's Walk	Captain Salazar	Television miniseries
1997	12 Angry Men	Juror #11	Television film
1998	Touched by an Angel	Col. Victor Walls	Episode: "God and Country"
1998	The Wall	Col. Holst	Television film; segment: "The Pencil Holder"
1998	The Taking of Pelham One Two Three	Det. Anthony Piscotti	Television film
1999	Bonanno: A Godfather's Story	Salvatore Maranzano	Television film
1999	Crucible of Empire: The Spanish-American War	Narrator	Documentary film
1999–2000	The West Wing	Associate Justice Roberto Mendoza	2 episodes
2000	Super Bowl XXXIV: Halftime Show	Narrator	Sports event
2000	The Princess & the Barrio Boy	Nestor Garcia	Television film
2001	The Judge	Judge Armando	Television film
2001	In the Time of the Butterflies	Rafael Trujillo	Television film
2002–2004	American Family	Jess Gonzalez	17 episodes
2003	Battlestar Galactica	William Adama	Miniseries
2004–2009	Battlestar Galactica	William Adama	73 episodes; also director
2004	The Batman	Angel Rojas	Voice, episode: "The Bat in the Belfry"
2006	Walkout	Julian Nava	Television film; also director
2007	George Lopez	Mr. Enrique Vega	Episode: "George decides to sta-local where it's Familia"
2010	CSI: NY	Luther Devarro	Episode: "Sangre Por Sangre"
2011	Dexter	Professor James Gellar	10 episodes
2011	Eureka	Rudy	Episode: "Do you see what I see?"
2012	Portlandia	Himself	Episode: "One Moore Episode"
2015	Agents of S.H.I.E.L.D.	Robert Gonzales	5 episodes
2015	The Simpsons	Pit Master	Voice, episode: "Cue Detective"
2016	Urban Cowboy	Al Robles	Pilot
2017	Narcos	Chucho Peña	2 episodes
2018–2023	Mayans M.C.	Felipe Reyes	Main role
2018–2019	Elena of Avalor	King Pescoro	Voice, 3 episodes
2019	Bless This Mess	Randy	Episode: "The Grisham Gals"
2024	Moon Girl and Devil Dinosaur	Molecule Man	Voice, 2 episodes
2024	Blue Bloods	Lorenzo Batista	Episode: "End of Tour"

=== Music videos ===
Year	Title	Artist
1995	"I Will Remember"	Toto
2006	Vato	Snoop Dogg featuring B-Real

== Awards and nominations ==
Year	Nominated work	Award	Results
1985	Miami Vice	Golden Globe Award for Best Supporting Actor - Series, Miniseries or Television Film	Won
1985	Miami Vice	Primetime Emmy Award for Outstanding Supporting Actor in a Drama Series	Won
1986	Miami Vice	Primetime Emmy Award for Outstanding Supporting Actor in a Drama Series	Nominated
1988	Stand and Deliver	Independent Spirit Award for Best Male Lead	Won
1988	Stand and Deliver	Academy Award for Best Actor	Nominated
1988	Stand and Deliver	Golden Globe Award for Best Actor - Motion Picture Drama	Nominated
1994	The Burning Season	Golden Globe Award for Best Supporting Actor - Series, Miniseries or Television Film	Won
1994	The Burning Season	Primetime Emmy Award for Outstanding Supporting Actor in a Miniseries or a Movie	Nominated
1997	Selena	ALMA Award for Outstanding Actor in a Feature Film	Won
1997	Hollywood Confidential	ALMA Award for Outstanding Actor in a Miniseries or Television Film	Nominated
2001	The Judge	ALMA Award for Outstanding Actor in a Miniseries or Television Film	Nominated
2003	Battlestar Galactica	ALMA Award for Outstanding Actor in a Drama Series	Won
2005	Battlestar Galactica	ALMA Award for Outstanding Actor in a Series, Miniseries or Television Film	Won
2006	Battlestar Galactica	ALMA Award for Outstanding Actor - Television Series, Mini-Series, or TV Movie (tied with Michael Peña)	Won
2007	Battlestar Galactica	Saturn Award for Best Actor on Television	Nominated
2008	Battlestar Galactica	Saturn Award for Best Actor on Television	Won
2009	Battlestar Galactica	ALMA Award for Best Actor on Television	Nominated
2011	Dexter	Screen Actors Guild Award for Outstanding Performance by an Ensemble in a Drama Series	Nominated
2011	Dexter	Saturn Award for Best Guest Starring Role on Television	Nominated
2016	Himself	Mary Pickford Award	Won
