= Kenedy, Texas =

- City
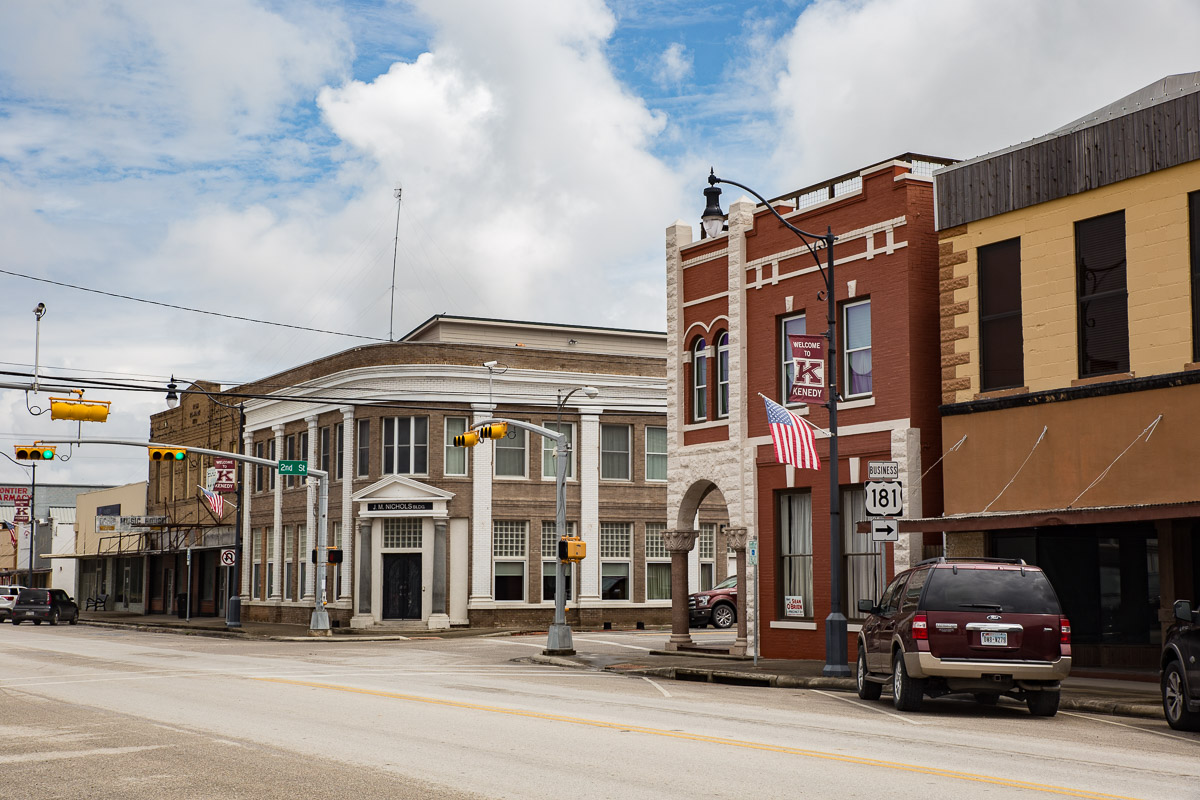
- Downtown Kenedy
- Motto: "The Junction Where Good Friends Meet"
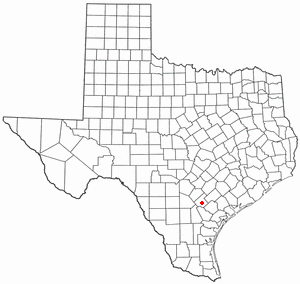
- Location of Kenedy, Texas

- Coordinates: 28°49′N 97°51′W
- Country: United States
- State: Texas
- County: Karnes

Government
  - Mayor: Alberto "Bert" Hernandez Baldarramos

Area
  - Total: 3.68 sq mi (9.52 km^{2})
  - Land: 3.66 sq mi (9.49 km^{2})
  - Water: 0.012 sq mi (0.03 km^{2})
- Elevation: 266 ft (81 m)

Population (2020)
  - Total: 3,473
  - Density: 914.7/sq mi (353.17/km^{2})
- Time zone: UTC-6 (Central (CST))
  - Summer (DST): UTC-5 (CDT)
- ZIP code: 78119
- Area code: 830
- FIPS code: 48-38860
- GNIS feature ID: 1360572
- Website: www.kenedytx.gov

Kenedy is a city in Karnes County, Texas, United States, named for Mifflin Kenedy, who bought 400,000 acres (1,600 km^{2}) and wanted to develop a new town that would carry his name. The population was 3,473 at the 2020 census, up from 3,296 at the 2010 census.

== History ==
In the early 1900s many of Kenedy's gunfighter shootings caused the town to be nicknamed "Six Shooter Junction".

In 1901, Gregorio Cortez and his brother Romaldo were tenant farmers on the W. A. Thulmeyer Ranch, approximately ten miles west of Kenedy. While investigating a reported horse theft, Karnes County Sheriff W. T. "Brack" Morris and his deputies questioned several Kenedy residents before traveling to the ranch. A confrontation there, complicated by misunderstandings in translation, resulted in Morris wounding Romaldo and Cortez shooting and killing Morris. Cortez subsequently fled, beginning a widely publicized manhunt.

The incident became the subject of El Corrido de Gregorio Cortez, one of the best-known Mexican-American corridos of the period. The story was later examined by Américo Paredes in his 1958 book With His Pistol in His Hand and adapted into the 1982 film The Ballad of Gregorio Cortez, starring Edward James Olmos.

During World War II, the Kenedy Alien Detention Camp was located near the outskirts of the town, on a former Civilian Conservation Corps site. Though it later served as a prisoner of war camp, it started as an internment camp for people of German, Italian, and Japanese ancestry deported from Latin America, as well as some who were long-term residents of the U.S. The camp opened in April 1942, when the first group of Latin American deportees arrived: 456 Germans, 156 Japanese and 14 Italians. Despite State Department prisoner exchanges, in which German and Japanese Latin Americans were "repatriated" and traded for U.S. citizens in Axis custody, Kenedy's population swelled to 2,007 by October 1943: 1,168 Germans, 705 Japanese, 72 Italians, and 62 "miscellaneous". The 705 of Japanese descent included U.S. civilians. In 1944, the remaining internees were transferred to other facilities, and by September it had been converted to a German POW camp; beginning in July 1945, the camp was also used to house Japanese POWs. The camp was closed at the end of the war, in September 1945.

The John B. Connally Unit, a state prison, is located 2 miles (3 km) south of the city limits. On December 13, 2000, a group called the Texas Seven escaped from that prison. They would go on a deadly crime spree before being caught.

On July 24, 2019, the Karnes Countywide Newspaper featured a story on a Kenedy house with ties to a world famous San Antonio landmark. Blueprints by Hugman-Silber Architects were discovered in the cedar closet of the house. The blueprints were drawn and traced by Robert H.H. Hugman, the acknowledged visionary behind the San Antonio River Walk.

== Geography ==
Kenedy is located in south-central Karnes County at 28°49′N 97°51′W (28.8143, –97.8496). U.S. Route 181 runs through the west side of the city, leading northwest 6 miles (10 km) to Karnes City, the county seat, and 60 miles (97 km) to San Antonio. To the south US-181 leads 31 miles (50 km) to Beeville and 88 miles (142 km) to Corpus Christi. Texas State Highway 72 (Main Street) passes through the center of Kenedy, leading northeast 25 miles (40 km) to Yorktown and southwest 33 miles (53 km) to Three Rivers.

According to the United States Census Bureau, the city of Kenedy has a total area of 3.6 square miles (9.4 km^{2}), of which 0.01 square miles (0.03 km^{2}), or 0.29%, are water.

== Demographics ==
Historical population
Census	Pop.	Note	%±
1910	1,147		—
1920	2,015		75.7%
1930	2,610		29.5%
1940	2,891		10.8%
1950	4,234		46.5%
1960	4,301		1.6%
1970	4,156		−3.4%
1980	4,356		4.8%
1990	3,763		−13.6%
2000	3,487		−7.3%
2010	3,296		−5.5%
2020	3,473		5.4%
U.S. Decennial Census

=== 2020 census ===
As of the 2020 census, Kenedy had a population of 3,473. The median age was 39.1 years. 24.4% of residents were under the age of 18 and 17.9% of residents were 65 years of age or older. For every 100 females there were 99.0 males, and for every 100 females age 18 and over there were 94.2 males age 18 and over.

0.0% of residents lived in urban areas, while 100.0% lived in rural areas.

There were 1,352 households in Kenedy, of which 31.5% had children under the age of 18 living in them. Of all households, 38.3% were married-couple households, 24.0% were households with a male householder and no spouse or partner present, and 31.1% were households with a female householder and no spouse or partner present. About 29.5% of all households were made up of individuals and 12.4% had someone living alone who was 65 years of age or older.

There were 1,669 housing units, of which 19.0% were vacant. The homeowner vacancy rate was 3.0% and the rental vacancy rate was 18.9%.

Racial composition as of the 2020 census
Race	Number	Percent
White	1,929	55.5%
Black or African American	79	2.3%
American Indian and Alaska Native	28	0.8%
Asian	59	1.7%
Native Hawaiian and Other Pacific Islander	1	0.0%
Some other race	496	14.3%
Two or more races	881	25.4%
Hispanic or Latino (of any race)	2,479	71.4%

=== 2000 census ===
As of the 2000 census, there were 3,487 people, 1,266 households, and 907 families residing in the city. The population density was 1,049.2 inhabitants per square mile (405.1/km^{2}). There were 1,550 housing units at an average density of 466.4 per square mile (180.1/km^{2}). The racial makeup of the city was 72.44% White, 3.18% African American, 0.72% Native American, 0.72% Asian, 0.17% Pacific Islander, 20.68% from other races, and 2.09% from two or more races. Hispanic or Latino of any race were 64.90% of the population.

There were 1,266 households, out of which 36.8% had children under the age of 18 living with them, 48.4% were married couples living together, 17.1% had a female householder with no husband present, and 28.3% were non-families. 25.8% of all households were made up of individuals, and 13.2% had someone living alone who was 65 years of age or older. The average household size was 2.67 and the average family size was 3.20.

In the city, the population was spread out, with 29.0% under the age of 18, 9.4% from 18 to 24, 24.3% from 25 to 44, 19.8% from 45 to 64, and 17.5% who were 65 years of age or older. The median age was 36 years. For every 100 females, there were 86.8 males. For every 100 females age 18 and over, there were 83.5 males.

The median income for a household in the city was $24,647, and the median income for a family was $25,152. Males had a median income of $25,779 versus $17,895 for females. The per capita income for the city was $13,929. About 23.4% of families and 25.8% of the population were below the poverty line, including 33.1% of those under age 18 and 11.9% of those age 65 or over.

== Education ==
The city is served by the Kenedy Independent School District.

== Notable people ==
- Carl Baugh, Young-Earth creationist
- Jim Busby, Major League Baseball player
- Blas Elias, musician (Slaughter, Trans Siberian Orchestra)
- Cliff Gustafson, head coach for 29 seasons of the University of Texas at Austin baseball team
- Mike Whitwell, NFL player

== Climate ==
The climate in this area is characterized by hot, humid summers and generally mild to cool winters. According to the Köppen Climate Classification system, Kenedy has a humid subtropical climate, abbreviated "Cfa" on climate maps.
