= Live365 =

Internet radio network

LIVE365
- Type: Private
- Industry: Internet Radio
- Founded: 1999; 27 years ago
- Headquarters: Pittsburgh, PA
- Area served: Global
- Key people: Jon Stephenson (CEO)
- Website: live365.com

LIVE365 is an Internet radio platform owned by SoundStack Inc., a Pittsburgh-based audio technology company. As the world's longest-operating internet radio platform, Live365 provides individuals, schools, and media organizations with tools to create, license, distribute, and monetize online radio stations.

Founded in 1999 in Foster City, California, Live365 pioneered bundled music licensing for webcasters and developed early technologies for server-side ad insertion, scalable streaming infrastructure, and connected-device playback. The company currently operates under SoundStack Inc., which has been recognized on the Inc. 5000 Fastest-Growing Companies list.

== History ==
=== Heritage and Longevity (1999–2005) ===
==== Founding and Early Pivot ====
Live365 originated as a project within Nanocosm Inc., a technology startup founded by Alex Sanford and Steve Follmer. Initially focused on "NanoHome," a 3D virtual home website, the company pivoted after employee Andy Volk developed a community radio concept using Shoutcast technology. Developed alongside CTO Peter Rothman, the service launched publicly in July 1999. The platform's name was derived from its initial offering: free hosting for up to 365 simultaneous listeners and 365 megabytes of storage per station.

==== Business Model Evolution ====
Following the dot-com collapse and rising music royalty costs, Live365 transitioned from a free service to a paid broadcasting model in September 2001. By bundling music licensing into its subscription tiers, the company became an early adopter of the "one-contract" licensing model. This allowed the platform to remain financially viable during a period when many contemporary streaming services ceased operations. In March 2003, the company further diversified its revenue by launching "VIP," a commercial-free listener membership.

At launch, broadcasting and listening on Live365 was free of charge. Stations had a maximum listener cap of 365 simultaneous listeners and 365 megabytes of storage for music and audio. In September 2001, Live365 began charging for use of its broadcasting services to remain financially viable in the wake of rising music royalty costs. More expensive plans allowed stations to have more simultaneous listeners and a greater amount of music file storage space. Members who joined before September 2001 could continue broadcasting with their original package for free. This model would later be replaced with one in which all members pay, but those who joined before September 2001 received a discount. In March 2003, Live365 launched their commercial-free membership called VIP.

==== Early Partnerships and Technical Innovation ====
During its first decade, Live365 established several partnerships that expanded internet radio into consumer hardware and artist-led curation:

- Nothing Records (1999): A partnership with Trent Reznor’s Nothing Records resulted in "Nothing Radio," one of the first artist-curated streaming networks to use licensed catalog content.
- Kerbango (2000): Live365 integrated its station directory into the Kerbango Internet Radio (a division of 3Com), one of the first stand-alone hardware devices designed for streaming audio.
- TiVo (2005): A co-marketing agreement enabled broadband-connected TiVo DVRs to stream Live365 stations directly through the device interface. This represented an early example of over-the-top (OTT) audio streaming on consumer hardware.

==== Industry Impact ====
At the 2001 Consumer Electronics Show, Live365 demonstrated in-car streaming, preceding the widespread adoption of mobile streaming applications by several years. The platform also developed proprietary advertising technology; a 2001 StreamingMedia feature highlighted its Ad Insertion Server, one of the first server-based systems for dynamic, in-stream audio advertising. Alongside pioneers such as Shoutcast, Spinner.com and Broadcast.com, Live365 is recognized for contributing to the foundational infrastructure of web-based broadcasting.

=== Regulatory Advocacy and Licensing ===
Throughout the 2000s, Live365 was a central figure in the legal disputes surrounding internet radio royalties. Following the passage of the Digital Millennium Copyright Act (DMCA), the company participated in the negotiations that led to the Small Webcaster Settlement Acts of 2002 and 2009. These legislative efforts allowed small-scale broadcasters to pay royalties based on a percentage of revenue or at a reduced per-performance rate, a model that Live365 helped champion to sustain the independent broadcasting community.

=== Shutdown and Acquisition (2016) ===
In late 2015, the Small Webcaster Settlement Act expired, leading to a significant increase in royalty rates for independent streaming platforms. On January 31, 2016, Live365 officially ceased operations and laid off its staff after its investors withdrew support due to the shifting regulatory landscape and the loss of the "small webcaster" royalty provisions. The shutdown resulted in the temporary loss of thousands of independent stations, an event widely covered in the technology press as a "dark day" for internet radio.

Later that year, the company’s assets were acquired by Jon Stephenson, founder of EmpireStreaming (later SoundStack Inc.). Stephenson rebuilt Live365 as part of a unified audio-infrastructure platform encompassing streaming, licensing, and monetization.

=== Relaunch and Expansion (2017–Present) ===
Live365 officially relaunched in May 2017, debuting a redesigned broadcaster dashboard, simplified station setup, and fully automated licensing coverage across the United States and Canada. It later expanded into the United Kingdom (2021) and Mexico (2025).

The modern Live365 platform combines stream hosting, performance-rights licensing, ad monetization, and distribution. Through partnerships with TuneIn, iHeartRadio (U.S. and Mexico), Audacy, Radioline, and airable, broadcasters gain global reach from a single account.

Over its history, Live365 has hosted hundreds of thousands of internet radio stations—one of the largest totals in the industry—and continues to power thousands of active stations worldwide.

== Operations ==
=== Licensing Coverage ===
Live365's bundled licensing simplifies compliance for webcasters across multiple territories, covering major performance rights organizations in the United States (ASCAP, BMI, SESAC, GMR, SoundExchange, AllTrack, and Word Collections), Canada (SOCAN, Re:Sound), the United Kingdom (PRS for Music and PPL UK), and Mexico (SOMEXFON and SACM).

This “one-contract” model allows broadcasters to operate legally without managing individual licensing agreements, reducing administrative and legal complexity.

=== Business Model and Services ===
Live365 operates as a software-as-a-service (SaaS) platform that enables broadcasters to create and manage internet radio stations without managing individual rights or infrastructure. Its tiered subscription plans include hosting, bandwidth, analytics, and bundled licensing.

Broadcasters can choose between ad-supported and commercial-free packages. Under ad-supported plans, Live365 shares advertising revenue via its integrated marketplace, which connects to programmatic audio exchanges.

The platform provides automation tools, live-broadcast support, listener metrics, and global distribution through partners such as TuneIn, iHeartRadio, Audacy, Radioline, and airable.

== Technology and Advertising ==
Throughout the early 2000s, Live365 operated a proprietary streaming engine known as Nanocaster, optimized for efficient bandwidth usage and scalable multi-station hosting. Later deployments integrated Icecast- and Shoutcast-compatible endpoints, allowing interoperability with third-party broadcast software.

The company's technical innovations included adaptive-bandwidth streaming, centralized listener analytics, and metadata-triggered ad insertion—precursors to modern cloud-based streaming technologies. Since its inception, Live365 has supported server-side ad insertion for both pre-roll and mid-roll placements. The system evolved into a metadata-based trigger architecture, enabling geographic and time-specific advertising.

Industry publications including StreamingMedia, Forbes, and The Wall Street Journal have described Live365 as one of the earliest webcasting companies to integrate licensing, monetization, and hosting into a unified service.

== Corporate Structure & Leadership ==
Live365 was acquired in 2016 by entrepreneur Jon Stephenson, who also owned the streaming infrastructure companies EmpireStreaming and Abovecast. Following the acquisition, these businesses were organized under a new holding company, Media Creek Inc.

In 2021, Media Creek consolidated its technology and service portfolio by merging EmpireStreaming and Abovecast into a single platform rebranded as SoundStack. SoundStack serves as the parent company of Live365, providing unified technology for streaming, licensing, and monetization.

=== Jason Stoddard - President ===
Jason Stoddard joined Live365 in February 2000 as part of its original technical-support team and has held leadership roles for more than two decades. He became General Manager in 2017 and President in 2024, leading the company through major initiatives including iHeartRadio U.S. and Mexico integrations, partnerships with Audacy (2024) and ChristianNetcast (2024), and licensing expansions into the U.K., Canada, and Mexico.

Under his leadership, Live365 modernized its platform, expanded global rights coverage, and strengthened broadcaster relationships across North America and Latin America.

=== Jon Stephenson - CEO / Owner ===
Jon Stephenson founded EmpireStreaming as a teenager, which later evolved into a leading audio-infrastructure provider and acquired Live365. By 2022, Live365, EmpireStreaming, Media Creek, and AudioCatapult were unified under the SoundStack brand as a comprehensive “audio-as-a-service” platform.

In January 2024, Radio Ink named Stephenson one of radio's “30 Under 30” leaders for his work in digital audio and monetization innovation.

== Reception and Rewards ==
Over two decades, Live365 has been covered by major technology and music publications including Wired, Forbes, Billboard, PC World, and The Wall Street Journal. Writers have credited the service with helping establish consumer webcasting and enabling small broadcasters to legally stream music online.

Streaming Media Magazine listed Live365 among the “Top 100 Companies That Matter Most in Online Audio” in 2003 and 2004.

- 2001 - Webby Award People’s Voice Award for Best Music Site
- 2002 - Webby Award People’s Voice Award for Best Music Site
- 2003 - WebAward for Best Music Website
- 2004 - Webby Award People’s Voice for Best Radio Site and WebAward for Best Radio Website
- 2004 - Nominated for Webby Award in Music category
- 2004–2005 - Hosted “Mikey Awards,” recognizing innovative stations across its network

== Company milestones ==
- July 1999: Developed originally as a virtual home environment named Nanohome, Live365 was created as a side project to create a form of online community radio. After popular public demand, focus shifted to developing Live365 full-time.
- October 1999: Basic mode broadcasting technology released to broadcasters. Technology noted as first of its kind for streaming internet broadcasts.
- November 1999: Live365 makes the cover of Billboard magazine
- 2001: New broadcasters’ packages upgraded, allowing for more storage space and simultaneous listeners. Previous limited space included 365 MB for storage and 365 simultaneous listeners.
- 2001: Live365 launched Player365 for PocketPC the First and Only Streaming MP3 Player for Pocket PC and introduced the very first wireless Internet radio (7 years before the launch of the iPhone)
- 2002: Royalty rights continue to climb for internet radio services. Live365 fights back by airing public service announcements about increasing royalty rates on their stations.
- March 2003: Launches ad-free VIP membership service (originally called Preferred Membership)
- November 2003: Releases Radio365 – desktop player for Mac
- March 2004: Releases Radio365 – desktop player for Windows
- August 2005: Launches on TiVo streaming devices
- June 2007: Copyright Royalty Board hearings in Washington, D.C. Live365 joins other internet radio companies in opposing higher music royalty rates.
- November 2007: Windows mobile app released
- April 2009: Mobile app for iPhone released.
- July 2010: Website redesign with an updated logo design. The new design includes an embedded audio player that's accessible from every page of the website. The player features album art, recommendations, and sharing features including Facebook, Twitter, Presets, and improved station search.
- November 16, 2010: Releases two new targeted websites: The female centric Athena365, and MyGen365, an internet radio site dedicated to baby boomers.
- April 7, 2011: Next generation of Live365 Radio iPhone app released
- June 28, 2011: Mobile app for Android devices released
- September 2011: Begins streaming on Roku devices
- October 2011: Launches Pro Points program paying Professional Broadcasters for reaching certain milestones
- December 2011: Live365 app released on Amazon Kindle Fire devices
- April 2012: Releases multi-platform desktop player called Live365 Desktop
- August 2012: Launches dedicated iPad app
- March 2013: Launches Studio365 mobile app
- January 31, 2016: Operations terminated due to imposition of higher royalty rates
- July 2016: Temporary suspends operations
- January 2017: Live 365 resumes operations.

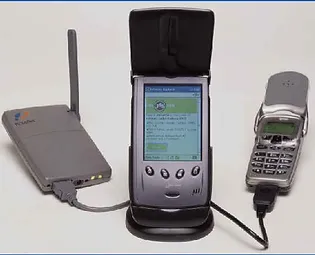
Player365 on iPAQ Beta Build

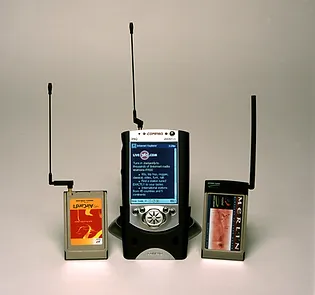
IPAQ with Ricochet Modems and Live365's Player365 streaming media software
