= Colonial roots of gender inequality in Africa =

Social inequalities between men and women in Africa

The colonial roots of gender inequality refers to the political, educational, and economic inequalities between men and women in Africa. According to a Global Gender Gap Index report published in 2018, it would take 135 years to close the gender gap in Sub-Saharan Africa and nearly 153 years in North Africa. While much more is known about the effects of colonialism on all African people, less is known about the impacts of colonialism on specifically women. There are competing theories about the cause of gender inequality in Africa. Some scholars suggest its genesis is in slavery and colonialism. Some Scholars argue that, colonialism resulted in an erosion of traditions and rights that formerly granted women equality and esteem. Some women in pre-colonial Africa held positions of power and were influential in many aspects of their societies. Other women were slaves in pre-colonial African societies. All this changed during the colonial period. With new forms of gender inequality introduced, many of the cultural underpinnings of African societies were eroded, and this harm has been challenging to mend. Theoretical frameworks that help to explain the colonial roots of gender inequality include coloniality of power and coloniality of gender. These decolonial concepts provide an account of how gender inequality became situated within the African context and help to explain why present-day inequalities, including women's political underrepresentation, remain significant challenges for Africa.

On the other hand, pre-colonial slavery in Africa included kingdoms, such as the Yoruba kingdom, owning eunuchs, that is, slaves whose genitals had been mutilated. There were also women whose genitals had been mutilated, and female slaves in Africa before European colonialism. According to Yoruba anthropologist Daniel Fadipe, a Yoruba wife could be whipped by her husband in pre-colonial times. Slavery before Western colonialism can be attributed to indigenous African customs (including native patriarchy) and also to the expansion of Islam, since from the 7th century onwards, Arab Islam expanded into Africa and enslaved many African people. Millions of them, including women, were taken as slaves to the Middle East and others remained within the continent.

== History ==
Gender inequality on the African continent has exacerbated as a result of colonialism, which disrupted the pre-colonial economic, cultural, and political systems on the African continent. Colonialism introduced patriarchal norms, a disruption of traditional African gender roles, and the criminalization of indigenous practices.

Some scholars argue that, European powers altered African communities with their patriarchal norms. As a result, women were cast aside and given inferior positions in the home and in society. Colonialism established the notion that women were subordinate to males and that men should hold all positions of power and authority.

Female genital mutilation (FGM) causes pain to girls and women at the time of the ritual and later when urinating or menstruating, psychological trauma, chronic pain, and inability to feel pleasure during sexual intercourse, infections and in some cases death.It is an ancient African custom that dates back to Africa over 2,000 years. It was not introduced by Western settlers. British settlers tried to ban it in Kenya, but were unsuccessful.

Consequently, traditional African gender roles were transformed: in African countries, colonialism altered traditional gender roles. In many pre-colonial African communities, women held significant roles in agriculture and other economic activities. In West Africa, for example, women had much sway over disputes on markets and agriculture. Though with the establishment of colonial legal systems, laws were created that granted men precedence over women in matters of marriage and divorce. Thus, much of the pre-colonial activity that women were involved in was often ignored by colonial officials, who only appointed men to local political positions.

Scholars point to the colonial legacy of African underdevelopment to explain gender inequality and female disempowerment. When Europeans settled in Uganda it caused a century-long transformation of Kampala which led to a gender Kuznets curve. African men were educated and employed in the white-collar (high-status) economy built by the Europeans. Women, on the other hand, were slower to obtain education and employment in the white-collared economy. This disparity contributed to the gender inequality gap in the early pre-colonial period, however, the gender gap gradually decreased during the late colonial era. Economist believed the gender gap may have been rooted in indigenous social norms. Less-educated women often worked in traditional informal economies rather than formal work. Consequently, they were subjected to marital gender inequality in comparison to women who worked in the formal economies created by Europeans.

Literature often characterized African women as subservient to their fathers and husbands. But in pre-colonial Africa, women were queen-mothers, queen-sisters; princesses, chiefs and holders of offices and villages, occasional warriors, and in one well known case, the Lovedu, the supreme monarch. Yet, colonial laws and regulations restricted women's access to land and other resources, which resulted in their exclusion. In many African communities, colonization displaced women from their traditional roles in society, eroding their prestige and limiting them to passive beneficiaries of support.

Furthermore, many African indigenous traditions, like widow inheritance were made either completely illegal or restricted severely by colonial authorities, meaning that women would not benefit as they would during the pre-colonial period. The criminalization of indigenous ways of life frequently resulted in the demonization of African cultures. By imposing their own rules and ideals, which included a Westernized gender ideology that delegitimized native cultural practices, the colonial authorities intended to change the "uncivilized" African societies. As a result, women in post-colonial Africa were not always protected from certain abuses because their societal or political power was severely limited. Many scholars believe African women became virtually voiceless, unable to gain economic and political equality.

== Theories of gender inequality in Africa ==
Different theoretical frameworks have been identified by scholars as being at the root of gender inequality in Africa. Most theories establish that contemporary African societies cannot be viewed outside the context of European colonialism, as it is through this lens that the oppression and marginalization of women in Africa can be understood. Scholars generally believe that the present-day African patriarchal system is one modeled after the Eurocentric perspective, in which European hierarchical structures were adopted, contributing to the diminution of women's roles in family and home life throughout the continent. They identify notions of coloniality of power and coloniality of gender to help explain the genesis of gender inequality on the continent.

=== Coloniality of power ===
Scholars identify the concept of coloniality of power, coined by Aníbal Quijano, to provide a framework for understanding the role of colonialism in producing a power inequality between men and women. This concept, initially advanced in Latin America post-colonial studies, has now been adopted to describe the interactions between Europe and other parts of the world, like Africa. This theoretical framework establishes that colonialism regulated and continues to regulate various dimensions of African societies, including gender relations, culture, and the economy, among others, thereby establishing that the European imperial project is at the core of the oppression of women in Africa. This theory explains how historical patterns of dominance and social hierarchies are interwoven with contemporary forms of oppression and marginalization.

Patriarchy became accepted in African cultures and solidified the subjugation of women in Africa. According to scholars, patriarchy can be thought of as an ideology or political system where men direct women on what roles they shall or shall not play in society, and women are thought of as inferior to men. Yet, patriarchy was not Africa's primary system of political and social organization prior to colonization. Many matriarchal societies have existed throughout Africa's history where women played important roles and maintained social equilibrium. In pre-colonial Africa, there was no transition from matriarchy to patriarchy since the social structure was fundamentally matriarchal in that women held power, passed down property and lineage, and were the flexible party in marriage and sexual unions. This changed drastically with the introduction of colonialism. Coloniality of power illustrates how the power imbalance between men and women became severe with the introduction of colonialism.

=== Coloniality of gender ===
Coloniality of gender outlines that gender cannot be separated from colonialism. This theoretical framework, created by Maria Lugones to explain the role of colonialism in enacting Eurocentric gender structures onto Indigenous people of the Americas, builds on the coloniality of power framework to explain colonialism in Africa, though now with a deeper consideration of gender, sexuality, and race. From a coloniality of gender perspective, colonialism radically transformed the indigenous sense of identity and gender relations in Africa. Thus, Europeans understandings of gender supplanted pre-existing notions of sex and gender that had been established long before the arrival of Europeans. Furthermore, European understandings of gender became a tool for dominance by identifying two binary, hierarchical categories, where women became defined by their subservient relationship to men in all facets of life.

According to prominent de-colonial feminist scholar Oyeronke Oyewumi, "gender was not an organizing principle in Yoruba society prior to colonialization." Oyewumi bases this conclusion on her studies of the Yoruba people in modern-day Benin, Togo, and Nigeria, where she finds that it was the Western world that introduced the idea of gender as a tool for dominance that denotes two binary and hierarchical social categories. As a result, women came to be defined by their relationships to men and were consequently denied access to power, land, and leadership positions in society. With the introduction of gender as a concept, women were created as a distinguishable category that was always subordinate to men in Yoruba culture.

Furthermore, scholars note that colonial authorities viewed African families as places of tradition and custom that needed to be changed through colonial intervention. Through laws, colonial authorities aimed to radically change how African families operated, establishing new gender relationships based on what these authorities considered socially acceptable. Thereby, these authorities established new African "traditions", where communities and families who once deviated from Eurocentric norms, with non-patriarchal family structures or complementary gender relationships, now had to conform or face punishment or mistreatment.

However, several African authors disagree with Oyeronke Oyewumi's theory.

=== Indigenous Patriarchy ===
Some African authors argue that native African societies were patriarchal before the arrival of Europeans.

Nigerian Yoruba author Olufunmilola Omotayo in her article Traditional Marriage in Yoruba Culture: An Exploration of Male Domination (2023) claims that traditional Yoruba culture is patriarchal (male-dominated) and exemplifies this with 1) the fact that premarital virginity is required of women but not men, and women who are found not to be virgins upon marriage are shamed, humiliated, and ostracized from the community; 2) fertility is highly valued, but in cases of infertile couples, the woman is traditionally blamed without medical proof as to whether it is she or the husband who cannot bear children; 3) and the man and his family pay a “bride price” for the man to marry, which is described as an argument used by some husbands, and even the husband’s relatives, to feel entitled to mistreat the wife, since such a family “paid for her”, as if she were a “commodity”.

Omotayo and Fasoro (2022) point out that traditional Yoruba culture is patriarchal, as ancient customs such as female genital mutilation, widowhood rites and preference for male children persist.

According to Joseph Olukayode Akinbi (2015), widowhood rites are as old as Yoruba society itself. When a married man dies, the widow must seclude herself for several days and show her grief at losing her husband to prove that she did not kill him. She is often mistreated by the man's family and, after mourning, the widow is inherited by a male relative of her deceased husband (even when the decision is against her will), as is the rest of the man's property. These widowhood rites are and were also present in other African cultures since pre-colonial times.

=== Arab Islamic colonization and enslavement of Africans ===
According to some authors including Senegalese Tidiane N'Diaye and Ghanaian John Azumah, although Arab colonization of Africa is less well known than European colonization, it was no less damaging to Africans. In countries such as Mauritania and Yemen, Arabs have black slaves to this day. In others, such as Saudi Arabia, slavery was abolished only in 1962.

Black Africans who were enslaved to be taken to North Africa and the Arab world were castrated. Their penises were mutilated so that they would have no sexual desires and could serve as guards in the harems of their Arab masters. Three-quarters of them died from amputation, but those who did not were taken to the Middle East. These castrated slaves are known as eunuchs. N’Diaye (2008) notes that while the European-led transatlantic African slave trade lasted four centuries, the Arabs raided sub-Saharan Africa for thirteen centuries without interruption. Most of the millions of men they deported disappeared due to inhumane treatment and widespread castration.

There is no current custom of mutilating the penis or penis and testicles of men in any culture in the world, but female genital mutilation is widely practiced in Africa (and other regions).

Gerry Mackie suggests that there is a clear connection between female genital mutilation and slavery. Before the rise of Islam, Egyptians raided southern territories for slaves, and Sudanese slaves were exported to areas along the Persian Gulf. Over time, an Islamic slave trade developed in the same area, bringing concubines from the Sudanese region to Egypt and Arabia. Reports from the 15th and 16th centuries suggest that female slaves were sold for a higher price if they were “sewn together” in a way that made them incapable of conceiving.

According to E. H. Boyle (2002), in ancient times the Egyptian elite had large harems with infibulated slaves. At first, the women in the harems were local women. However, after the region converted to Islam, this was no longer possible because Islam forbids Muslims to enslave other Muslims. Therefore, as Islam expanded, slave traders went further afield, into the African continent, to find non-Muslim slaves for the harems. Presumably, slave traders introduced FGM to these more remote populations to increase the women’s value as slaves. Both Islamic conversion and FGM spread along these expanding slave routes.

== Gender roles in pre-colonial and post-colonial Africa ==
Women in all of pre-colonial Africa held positions of prominence and dignity. They played critical roles socially and economically, and contributed to the family by processing food, weaving, making pottery, and cooking. The roles of women changed drastically in the post-colonial period, where Europeans introduced a patriarchal system that devalued women and their contributions.

=== Pre-colonial Africa ===
In the pre-colonial societies, women were politically active and held many prominent roles. Women were largely included in important decision-making processes, as women were central figures whose commercial activities were engrained in the cultural fabric of their societies. They governed the home, which was a very important role with significant power. Because power and privilege were based on age and gender, elder women had a voice in many important issues concerning the family and community. Private and public activities were so commingled that the power and privilege women held in the home was often mirrored in public. Some literature details how women used the production of food to gain respect, and in turn, they used that respect to dominate the children and influence the men in their lives. Religious women prayed to the gods and spirits for power and influence.

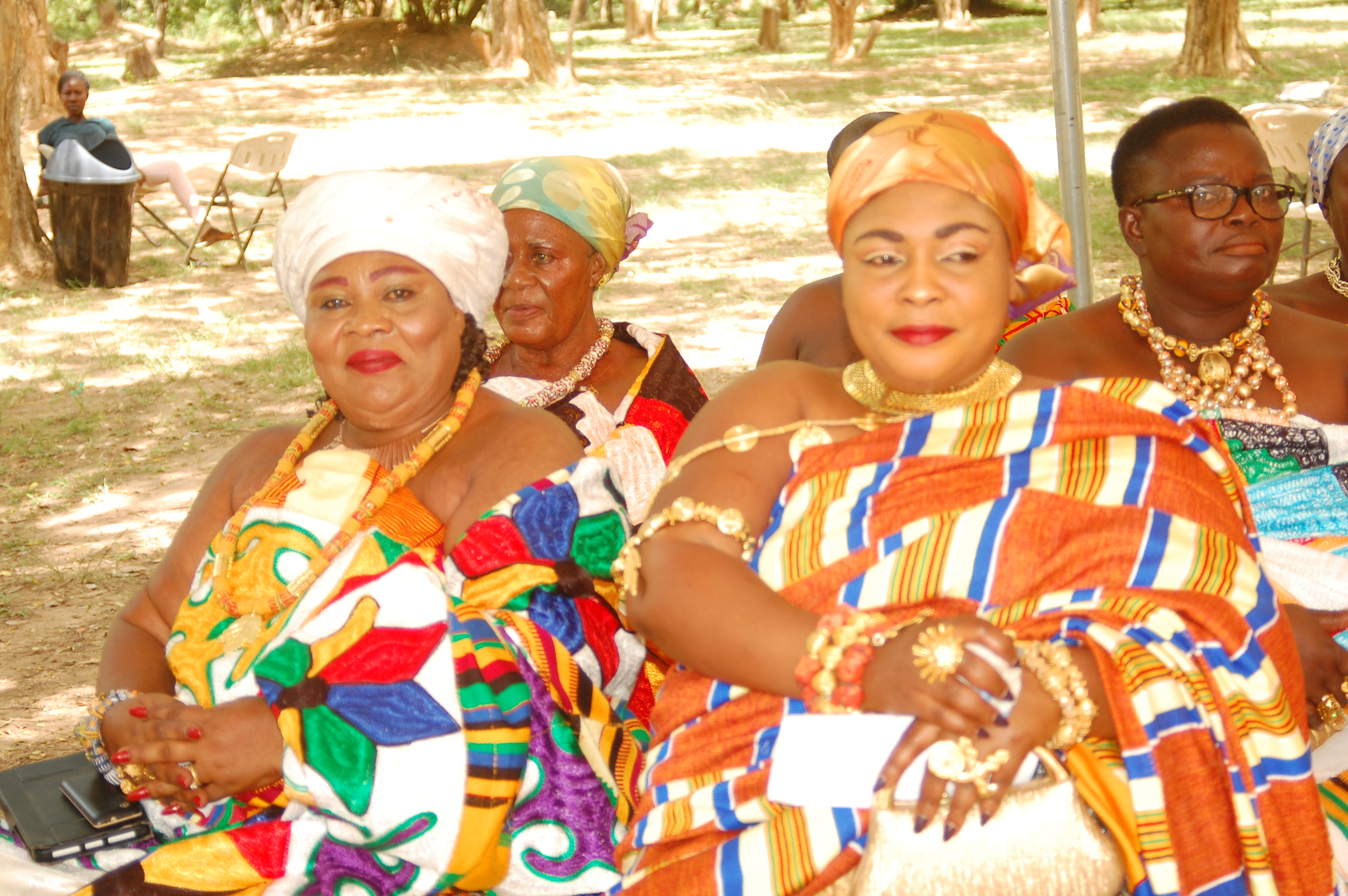
Image of Queen Mother from Akan (Ghana).

In Ghana, for example, the queen mothers of Asante were part of a dual-gender system of leadership alongside tribal chiefs. Together, the queen mothers and chiefs represented the center of authority for towns and villages in Asante culture, with the queen mother of Asante and the king of Asante serving as the final authority ruling over the Asante people.

Many women were involved in trade. Yoruba women, for example, were the central figures in long-distance trade. They amassed enormous wealth and held prominent titles. A successful Yoruba woman might hold the chieftaincy title of iyalode, which meant she had great privilege and power.

In northern Kenya, pastoralist women were given responsibility over the management of small cattle and processing of basic goods including meat, milk, and skins. These women had significant control over how these goods were traded and distributed.

=== Post-colonial Africa ===
In the 20th century, women lost their influence and power when patriarchy and colonialism changed gender relations. The role of female chiefs decreased as male chiefs negotiated with European colonial administrations in the oversight of taxes and governance. In Nigeria, Nigerian men and European firms dominated the distribution of rubber, cocoa, groundnuts (peanuts), and palm oil, as the economy became more and more dependent on cash crops for exports. This pushed women into the background where they were forced into the informal economy. The custom land-tenure systems that once provided women with access to land was exchanged for land commercialization which favored those with access to wealth earned from the sale of cash crops. Moreover, the European-style education system in post-colonial Africa favored boys over girls.

In northern Kenya, women lost their positions, authority, and respect that they had attained through their pastoralist responsibilities, as a result of a new colonial government that radically altered the social structure of their communities. Thereby, putting these women at the periphery of political and economic decision-making concerns.

In Ghana, a substantial paradigm shift emerged as a result of colonialism, where a divide between tribal chiefs and queen mothers was created, and the influence of queen mothers was substantially reduced. Though, because of continued resistance to these changes brought on by colonialism, queen mothers remained steadfast in their commitment to their communities and, after the rise of the global women's movement, later gained prominence in their roles once again.

== Gender inequalities in the 21st century ==
Many of the problems introduced through colonialism, have contributed to the systemic inequalities present today on the continent. Analysts and scholars contend that the global movements created to improve the livelihood of women in the West, and those living in urban cities, have not benefitted women in Sub-Saharan Africa. To close the gender gap in Africa, the issues African women face must become part of the global discussions. According to published reports, Sub-Saharan Africa is among the world's most gender-unequal regions. The United Nations Development Programme (UNDP), reports “perceptions, attitudes, and historic gender roles” prevent women from accessing health care and education and contributes to disproportionate levels of family responsibility, job segregation, and sexual violence. Women in Africa experience the greatest levels of discriminatory practices. In addition to facing structural barriers regarding educational and economic inequalities, women in Africa face major obstacles in being political representatives. Without adequate women's representation, it is hard for many of the present-day inequalities to be rectified.

=== Educational inequalities ===
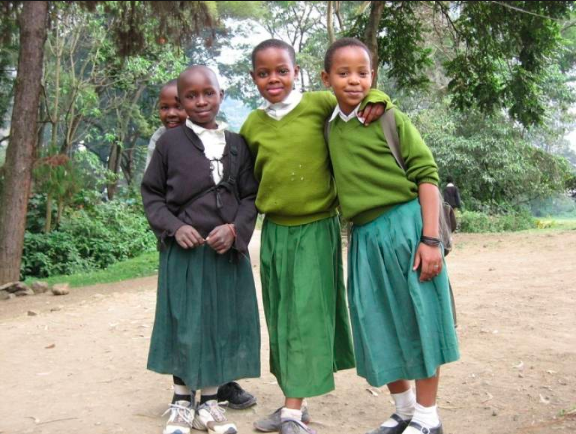
Image of primary school aged girls in Africa.

Theoretically, the inequality between boys and girls starts in primary school and widens throughout the educational process. Over the past decade, Africa registered the highest relative increase in primary education in total enrollment among regions. Girls, however, were enrolled at lower rates. In 2000, Sub-Saharan Africa reported 23 million girls were not enrolled in primary school, an increase of 3 million from a decade earlier when 20 million were not enrolled. Now in 2023, the gender educational gap is being significantly reduced with 66% of girls completing their primary education compared to 61% for boys, highlighting signs of progress in this regard.

Policy reforms in countries such as Benin, Botswana, the Gambia, Guinea, Lesotho, Mauritania, and Namibia made notable improvements in enrollment for girls. For example, in Benin, the gender gap has been combatted through several initiatives like media campaigns emphasizing to parents the necessity of enrolling girls in primary school as well reforms like making upper secondary school education free for girls.

Two of the biggest challenges facing young girls' educational pursuits in Africa include concerns of child marriage and human trafficking. Countries including Mauritania have combatted child marriage through public campaigns against the practice. Furthermore, the implementation of practices like bus transportation for young girls in rural areas has helped to combat human trafficking.

The female completion rate for primary education in many countries is staggeringly low. Thus, in order to address this issue, countries including Guinea have made girl's education a national priority through grassroots efforts. Programs aimed at encouraging mothers to advocate for their daughter's education as well as initiatives intended to increase the quality of girls' education have been critical in addressing this gap.

=== Economic inequalities ===
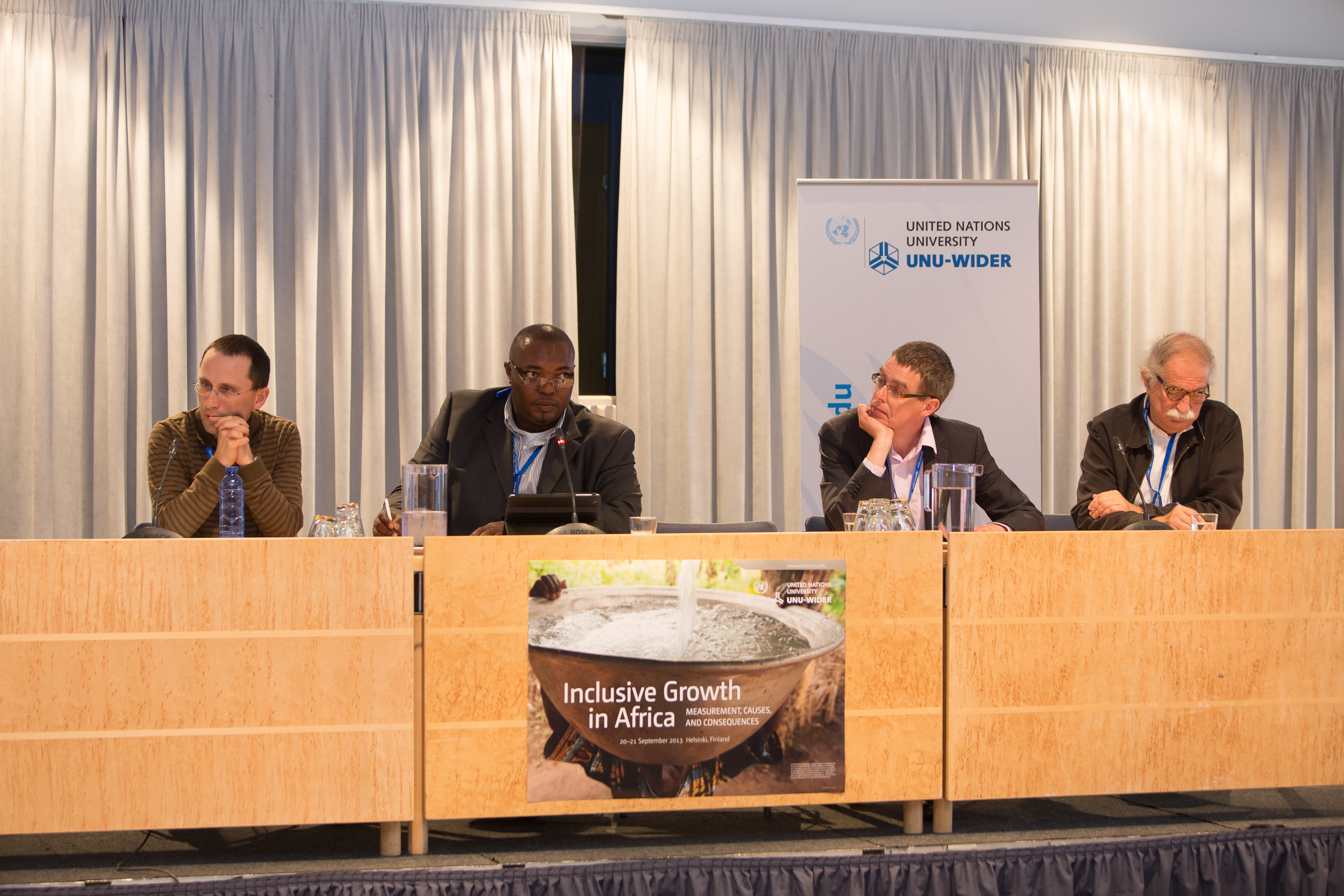
UN conference discussing how Africa can achieve inclusive economic growth and combat economic inequality.

Among the biggest challenges facing the continent is economic inequality, with women facing massive hurdles in being able to participate in areas such as employment and entrepreneurship. In Africa, women are still disproportionately employed in informal, unstable jobs with few possibilities for education or training.

It is believed that discriminatory social institutions cost Africa roughly 7.5% of its gross domestic product (GDP) in 2019. Analysts believe that women's inability to accumulate wealth has allowed for gender inequality to persist on the continent. According to the World Bank, 37% of women in Sub-Sahara Africa have a bank account, compared to 48% of men. These percentages are even lower for women in North Africa where two-thirds of the population remains unbanked.

Traditional gender roles have contributed to the economic inequality present in the region, with only 25% of women being the head of their household, compared to 70% of men. Such realities maintain unequal allocations of unpaid care work, which has a negative influence on women's labor-force participation. Women in Africa perform four times as much unpaid care and domestic work as men, which exceeds the global average. Men continue to dominate traditional working sectors, due to social norms that regard men as rightful owners. Women's ownership of land is, in turn, stifled, with women only owning 12% of agricultural land despite accounting for over half of Africa's agriculture workforce.

For women to escape poverty, analysts believe they need access to development policies that would place more emphasis on their contributions to the economy. Women contribute significantly to the population, but their labor participation is not fully accounted for because it is often derived from informal agricultural farming. Similarly, any work inside the home is not accounted for because it is not considered to be an economic activity. At the macro level, gender inequality is also costly. The UNDP reports countries in Sub-Saharan Africa lose approximately $95 billion annually because women are not integrated into the national economy. When impoverished women are unable to contribute socially, economic growth is stagnated.

Some women farmers do have access to financial resources, leading analysts to conclude financial empowerment would increase female participation in community decision-making and combat social marginalization, which would improve the overall family's well-being. Case studies show women who manage household finances are less likely to have children die from malnutrition.

According to the UNDP, one of the most significant changes needed would be commitments from financial institutions to offer products that meet the needs of women, which would give more women access to financial resources. By creating specific loan programs for crops that are traditionally grown by female farmers – such as groundnuts or sunflowers, financial institutions would encourage female leadership in farmers’ cooperatives, and support markets where women sell their harvests. Furthermore, the World Bank Group is working to facilitate financial capability trainings for women and the development of their business skills.

At current rates of financial inclusion, it would take the world more than 200 years to achieve gender parity globally, but analysts believe if governments, international actors, and the financial industry devise and sustain more gender-focused policies, the gender inequality gap would shorten more quickly.

=== Political underrepresentation ===
The legislatures of African nations have seen the highest increases of gender parity in the globe, due in large part to the implementation of quotas and reserved seats that have contributed to significant gains in the proportion of women in these national legislatures. Yet, from December 2021 to June 2022, only 17 women were elected or appointed to parliaments, ministerial, or electoral offices in West Africa out of the 134 positions that were available, and growth in women's participation in political bodies has been incredibly minor and slow, throughout the entire continent.

According to data from the Inter-Parliamentary Union (IPU), which tracks how many women are elected to parliaments all over the world, Sub-Saharan Africa is currently third out of the six major regional groupings, with a gender-parity percentage of 26%, behind the Americas and Europe, and ahead of Asia and the Pacific, and North Africa-Mideast. Regional figures on gender parity have been inflated by countries like Senegal, who passed a gender parity bill in 2010 requiring political parties to guarantee that women make at least 50 percent of their candidates. As well as countries like South Africa and Rwanda who have achieved a 30% UN benchmark of women in parliament, with Rwanda having constitutional provisions reserving seats for women, and South Africa's ruling party voluntarily allocating 50% of parliamentary seats to women. Though, most other countries in the region, including Nigeria and Benin, continue to be unable to pass gender equality legislation in Congress. In Benin, women remain significantly underrepresented in elected and appointed positions as a result of there being no laws or government initiatives taken to guarantee women's political representation. Compared to countries without quota-like policies, women's representation in countries with such policies is 10 percentage points higher. With scholars recognizing the role of female political representation in impacting young girls' career aspirations and education attainment, greater women's representation has the potential to alleviate other inequalities present on the continent in the long-term.

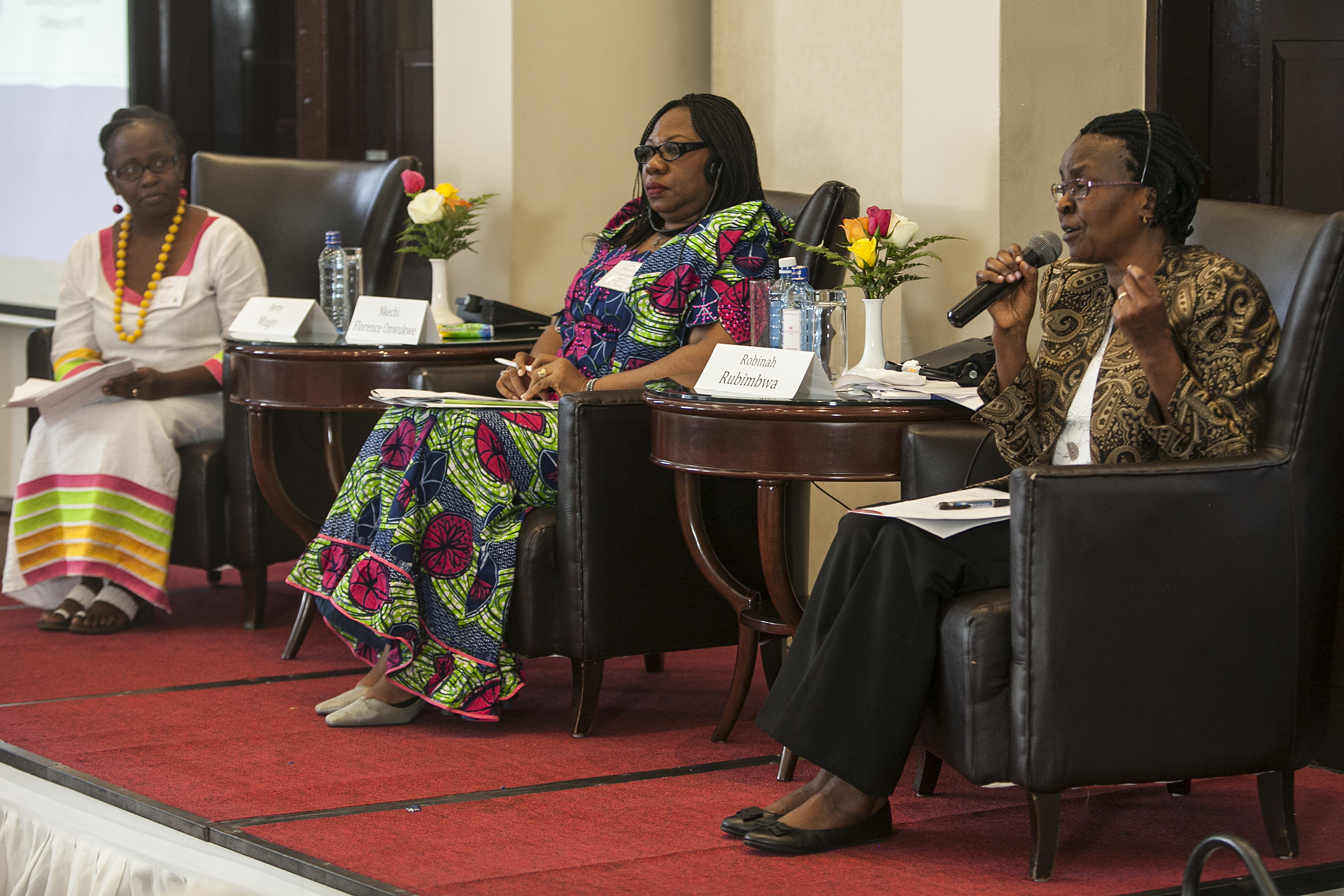
African women discussing the critical role of women leaders in establishing peace and security on the continent.

Despite the significant underrepresentation of women, there are signs of positive change. Djibouti, which had zero women in parliament in the year 2000, now has women comprising 26.2% of its parliamentary bodies. Furthermore, regarding ministerial positions, there have been significant increases in women ministers of defense, finance, and foreign affairs in 2019 compared to 2017, with Rwanda and South Africa leading the way in that regard. According to UN Women, structural barriers like discriminatory laws and practices, as well capacity gaps including a lack of resources and education, are the greatest barriers to women's participation in the political arena, so addressing the deficits in legal frameworks in many of these countries, along with educational and economic inequalities will be necessary in achieving gender equality in the region.
