= Xicanx =

Gender-neutral term for select Mexican subcultures

Xicanx (/ˈtʃiːkæŋks, ˈʃiː-/ CHEE-kanks, SHEE-, /ʃɪˈkænʃ/ shih-KANSH) is an English-language gender-neutral neologism and identity referring to people of Mexican descent in the United States. The ⟨-x⟩ suffix replaces the ⟨-o/-a⟩ ending of Chicano and Chicana that are typical of grammatical gender in Spanish. The term references a connection to Indigeneity, decolonial consciousness, inclusion of genders outside the Western gender binary imposed through colonialism, and transnationality. In contrast, most Latinos tend to define themselves in nationalist terms, such as by a Latin American country of origin (i.e. "Mexican-American").

Xicanx started to emerge in the 2010s and media outlets started using the term in 2016. Its emergence has been described as reflecting a shift within the Chicano Movement. The term has sometimes been used to encompass all related identifiers of Latino/a, Latin@, Latinx, Chicano/a, Chican@, Latin American, or Hispanic, and to replace what have been called colonizing and assimilationist terms, like Latino/a, Mexican American, Mestizo, and Hispanic. Xicanx has also sometimes been used to include colonized people outside of just Mexican descent, such as people from Central and South America.

== Usage and pronunciation ==
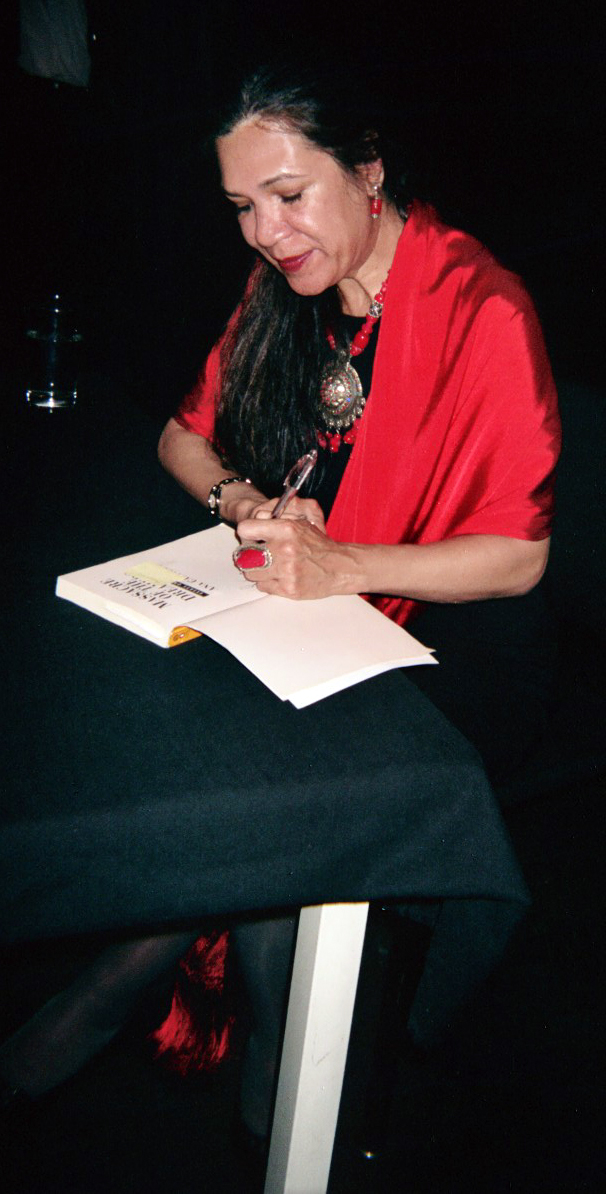
The X- in Xicanx aligns with its use in Xicanisma, developed by Ana Castillo (pictured)

Similar to Xicana and Xicano, the meaning of the X- in Xicanx is also reflected in Xicanisma, an intervention in Chicana feminism by Ana Castillo. It symbolizes the colonial encounter of Spanish colonizers and Indigenous peoples that came to produce the state name of México. Whereas older Spanish spellings of the country appeared as Méjico, the Mexican state used the X in reference to the Mexica in its project of Indigenismo. Jennie Luna and Gabriel S. Estrada wrote that "this state reclamation of Indigenismo was a racialized logic that favored modern mestizo identity rather than supporting the living Nahua and Indigenous pueblos."

Luna and Estrada cite indigenous peoples of Mexico who see the Mexican state as an agent of violence and destructive assimilationist practices in their communities. Recognizing this state violence, Luna and Estrada argue that it is important to deconstruct the notion that the X is only related to the Mexica people or "Aztec Empire" (who the Mexican state has centered in its project of Indigenismo and who Chicano nationalists centered in the Chicano Movement), stating that "the Nahuatl language existed before the Mexica migrated south into what is now Mexico City."

Contemporary usage of the term Xicanx has been described as taking on new meanings. Luna and Estrada state that it has transformed to "reject Mexica-centrism, and instead can be viewed from a broader perspective, one that more widely embraces the Uto-Nahuatl, Mayan, and other Indigenous language families spoken throughout the Americas." Mariel M. Acosta Matos states that some speakers have suggested pronouncing -x with its phonetic value in the Mayan language (/ʃ/ or ‘sh’), where Xicanx is then pronounced as Shi-kan-sh.

The X may be perceived then as "symbolic return to Nahuatl and Maya usage and pronunciation and thus retains potential for Indigenous reclamation." Luna and Estrada argue that Xicanas, Xicanos, and Xicanxs adopted the X "not only as a respelling, but also as a conscious resistance to further Hispanicization/colonization." This includes the Xicanisma principle of reinserting the feminine into one's consciousness that has been subordinated by Spanish colonization via the imposition of the coloniality of gender.

The rejection of this coloniality in Xicanx forefronts gender neutrality, which is represented in the second x in Xicanx. As noted by Acosta Matos, "the fact that Nahuatl and the Mayan languages do not have grammatical gender classes has also influenced the deployment of gender neutral forms" of terminology. As a result, Acosta Matos argues that "the use of -x reveals the intersection of race/ethnicity and (grammatical) gender politics: it ‘symbolizes’ efforts to decolonize language. Adopting and using gender neutral nouns and pronouns reclaims Mesoamerican activists’ Indigenous languages, as their linguistic systems do not conform with grammatical gender as codified in Spanish." Luna and Estrada refer to the second x as an "Indigenized genderqueer" representation that interrupts "colonization and male/female hierarchies" while still acknowledging that it operates within a "partially European construction of language." Xicanx has been referred to as a term that "moves closer to more Indigenous words, spellings, and identities."

== In literature and scholarship ==
=== Decoloniality ===
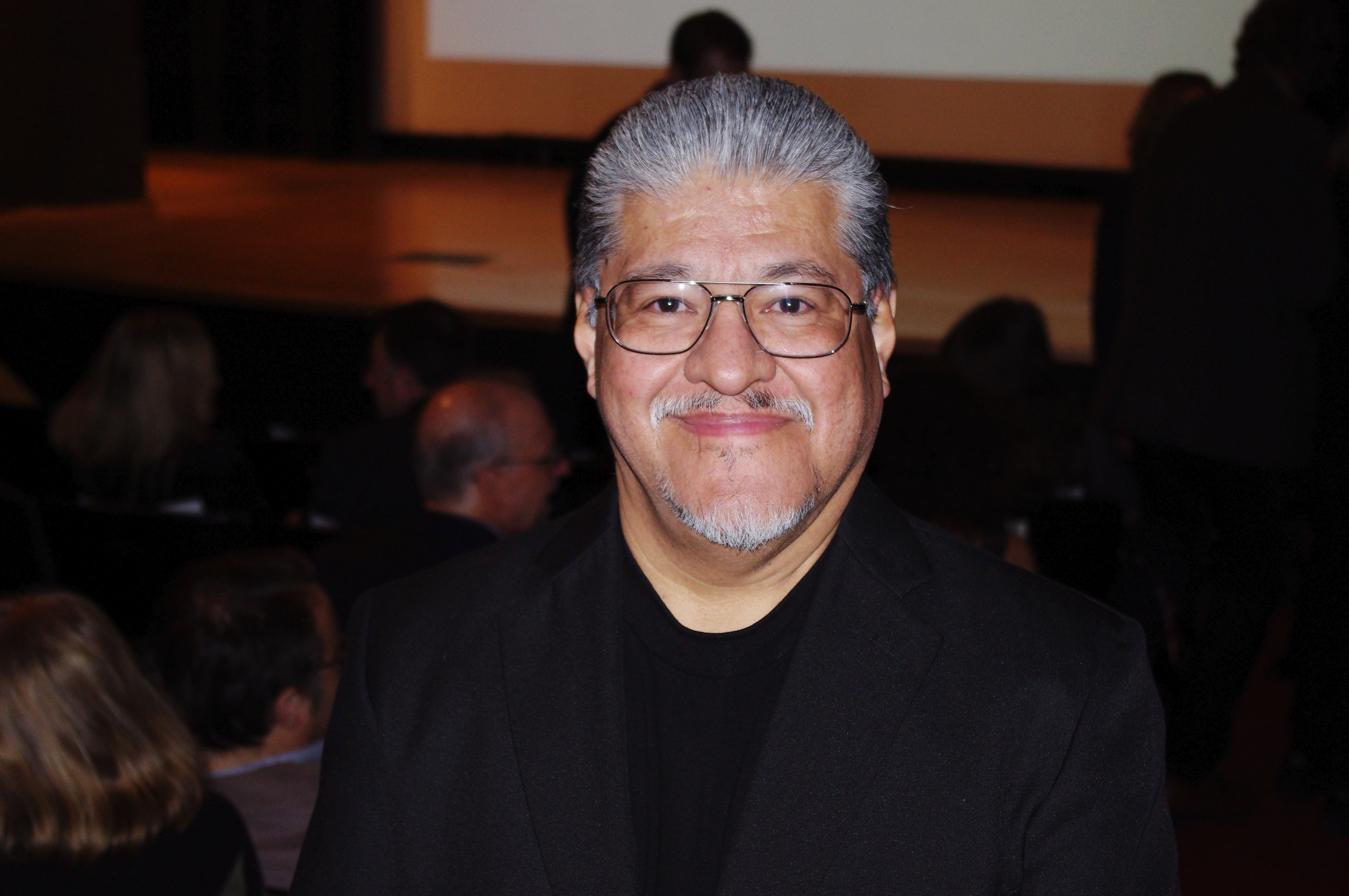
In his 2019 book, author Luis J. Rodriguez identifies himself as a Native Xicanx writer.

David Gutierrez states that Xicanx "accentuates indigenous connections among historically minoritized groups that are often categorized through a Eurocentric lens" and also acknowledges that the term removes colonial-imposed "gender biases that often exist in categorical labels [such as Latino or Chicano] to recognize the non-traditional gender diversity within our Xicanx community." Pedro J. DiPietro states that Xicanx is inclusive of all genders and gender non-conforming people and destabilizes the centrality of cisgender masculinity in Xicanx communities.

Artist Roy Martinez describes Xicanx as "not being bound to the feminine or masculine aspects," stating that "it's not a set thing" that people should feel enclosed in, but that it is a fluid identity that extends beyond fitting within the gender binary and beyond borders. In an analysis of Alfred Arteaga's poetry, editor David Lloyd states that "the invocation of the shifting times and spaces through which Xicanx culture and poetics have emerged out of an indigenous context through successive colonial displacements and the imposition of layers of imperial languages is crucial to Arteaga's mapping of the material foundations of a specifically Xicanx worldview, lodged in displacement and hybridity than any fixed identity." As stated by writer Christina Noriega, "there is no one 'formula' to be Xicanx."

Rose Borunda and Lorena Magalena Martinez describe the decolonial and transnational aspects of Xicanx identity:

The term "Xicanx" promotes a more inclusive and expansive view of Indigenous identity and stands separate from colonizing terms such as "Hispanic" or "Latino/a," terms that do not reflect indigeneity and that project the patriarchy of Spanish language with noun endings of "a" for female and "o" for male. The term, Xicanx, is inclusive of the Indigenous and colonized people of Mexican descent as well as the people who may originate from Central and South American nations.

=== Chicano vs. Xicanx ===
Luis J. Rodriguez argues that both Xicanx and Chicano "mean the same thing" and describes Xicanx as "the most recent incarnation of a word that describes people that are neither totally Mexican nor totally what is conceived as American." Jennie Luna and Gabriel S. Estrada state that while "the 1960s Chicano Movement focused on mestizo politics, later evolutions of the movement began to recognize the need for spiritual guidance and Indigenous perspectives" which has resulted in the emergence of Xicanx.

Susy Zepeda argues that the Chicano Movement offered "surface-level representations of the Mexica" and that the roots of de-Indigenization were not adequately explored nor were Indigenous peoples "understood as living entities." While the Chicano Movement's recognition of indigeneity was a problematic yet important step, Zepeda partially attributes the lack of a deeper exploration to fear or susto: "there is almost a palpable fear of knowing more about ancestral traditions, culture, discipline, and the decolonial pathway of spirit." As such, Zepeda calls upon Xicanx scholars to perform "a conscious examination within the field of colonial trauma or legacy of susto... [which] can lead to a 'path of conocimiento' and to sanación or healing of intergenerational traumas for Xicana/x detribalized peoples, without recreating forms of violence or the fear of appropriation."

== Organizations ==
Some grassroots activist organizations use the term Xicanx. The Xicanx Institute for Teaching & Organizing (XITO) emerged as a strategy to continue the legacy of the Mexican American Studies Department Programs (MAS) in Tucson Unified School District. After the unconstitutional ban of the MAS programs, XITO developed "a decolonizing and re-humanizing model of Ethnic studies professional development to counter the deficit model of current teacher education by infusing critical identity work—a critical analysis of race, power, and systems of oppression—together with an Indigenous epistemological framework formerly implemented in the highly successful MAS program." XITO has inspired teachers of color to develop pedagogical approaches using concepts such as Nahui Ollin and In Lak'ech. This methodology has been described as reframing education in a way that acknowledges Xicanx and Latino perspectives.

XicanX: New Visions was a national art exhibit curated by Dos Mestizx from February to June 2020 that featured the work of 34 artists. The exhibit received notable coverage after Xandra Ibarra's work was removed by city officials in San Antonio, Texas. The exhibition sought to challenge "previous and existing surveys of Chicano and Latino identity-based exhibitions."

The Raza Resource Centro at UC San Diego has hosted an annual Xicanx/Latinx Graduation ceremony since 2017.

== See also ==
- Arizona ban on ethnic studies
- Tupac Enrique Acosta
