= Tonatierra Community Development Institute =

Charity in Phoenix, Arizona

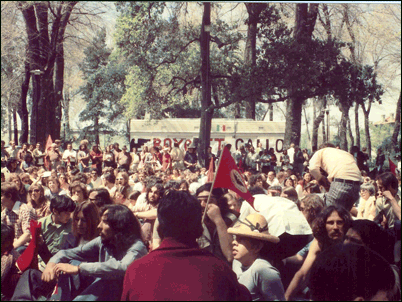
United Farm Workers rally for "Boycott Gallo" campaign.

The Tonatierra Community Development Institute is a non-profit organization located in Phoenix, Arizona. They promote the rights of Indigenous communities and peoples, in Phoenix and around the world through education, economic development, and community and individual action.

== History ==
Tonatierra grew out of the work during the late 1970s and mid-1980s with the Maricopa County Organizing Project and the United Farm Workers. The Maricopa County Organizing Project was officially founded in 1977 with the goal of protecting the rights of farmworkers, and moved to Phoenix in 1992. One of their key organizers, Tupac Enrique Acosta, subsequently founded Tonatierra Community Development Institute in 1993. In 2010, Tonatierra was involved in the ACLU federal lawsuit regarding the case titled "Indigenous Peoples as Migrant Workers".

== Community action and projects ==
Those involved with Tonatierra's work and community efforts focus on the process of decolonization that aligns with the community's specific cultural rights and cultural identity. Since the organization's formation nearly two decades ago, Tonatierra have created several projects, such as youth education/empowerment programs, cultural expression efforts and events, and social justice movements. For example, their project "Tititl" is a yearly event held on ceremonial grounds and is directed towards the children of local Indigenous families. Children spend the day participating in various traditional activities that create a unique learning experience for them.

== Goals ==
Since the beginning of Tonatierra, their main goals have been to provide access to cultural education and experiences of cultural awareness for indigenous communities in and around Phoenix. They believe in the power of preserving their culture and educating the youth on these topics as well. Additionally, Tonatierra has been recognized when it comes to organizations within the state of Arizona that have made efforts towards, "the possibilities for change when we dream, build, and imagine" in relation to impacts seen due to the Migrant Rights Movement of 2015. As a more overarching goal for the organization, they value recognizing rights within Indigenous communities, which they feel especially called to do due to the fact that the government lacks this type of support. Past and future efforts within the Tonatierra organization aim to act in accordance to these goals and their core value of truth. Efforts seen by Tonatierra, and other similar organizations that value Indigenous culture, can provide valuable framework when it comes to tackling some of the most pressing Sustainability and Environmental Justice challenges seen today
