= Annie Lopez =

Arizona-born Chicana visual artist (born 1958)

Annie Lopez (born 1958) is a Chicana visual artist working in photography and sculpture.

== Biography ==
Lopez was born in Phoenix, Arizona to Mexican immigrant parents and is the 3rd eldest of five children. At the age of 13, Lopez began to take an interest in photography and would initially use a Kodak Brownie camera to take pictures of her family. Wanting to further this interest, Lopez enrolled herself in her high school’s photography class for one semester. After completing high school, Lopez’s parents expected her to get married but she refused and instead went on to study commercial photography.

In 1982, Lopez became a member of the Movimiento Artístico del Rio Salado (MARS), which was an artist collective that addressed the underrepresentation of Chicanx artists in Phoenix art exhibitions and galleries. The MARS group would host their own galleries and exhibits that displayed MARS group member’s and fellow Chicanx artists. Lopez remained in the group for 17 years.

== Art ==
Many of Lopez's works consist of hand stitched clothing made out of cyanotype images printed onto tamale wrapping paper. Lopez’s printing process involves laying a negative image over primed paper, covering it in an iron based mixture, and placing it under direct sunlight where the image develops with a cyan blue tint. Lopez’s pieces highlight the social and political injustices experienced within the Phoenix and nationwide Latinx community, honor the lives of her family members, and reference her own childhood memories.

Favorite Things features cyanotype images printed on tamale wrapping paper that have been sewn together into the form of a dress. This piece was created as an homage to her childhood in Phoenix, with each of the cyanotype images depicting favorite objects, locations and childhood memories. The prints include a picture of Uncle John’s Pancake House, the Phoenix Suns basketball team logo, the mascot for the Tucson Roadrunners, an ad clipping of the first camera she purchased on her own, and the logo for the musical Annie.

Sold as Slave, Interpreter and Companion, and Survivor was created in 1995 and is a triptych that features three black and white images of women from Lopez’s family, with the first being her aunt, the second her mother, and the third being her uncle’s previous girlfriend. Lopez strategically chose photos where each woman was posing suggestively. Lopez intended for these women to be a representations of La Malincheshowcasing how the negative connotations associated with the popular Mexican figure have become a part of the gendered connotations that exist within today’s Chicanx community. Lopez wanted this piece to humanize La Malinche, showcasing that she was a woman with the same emotion, wit, and determination as her own female family members.

Show Me Your Papers and I’ll Show You Mine features Lopez’s cyanotype tamale wrapper prints sewn into a two-piece bathing suit. Lopez created this piece as a response to the signing of SB 1070, which was an Arizona law granting officials the right ask people they suspected to be immigrants for their papers as well as granting them the right to arrest immigrants without a warrant or probable cause. Lopez intended for this piece to be a crude way of showcasing how invasive the SB 1070 law was. The bathing suit featured prints of Lopez’s official government documents, such as her birth certificate, and award certificates she received as a child.
