= Decoloniality =

School of thought

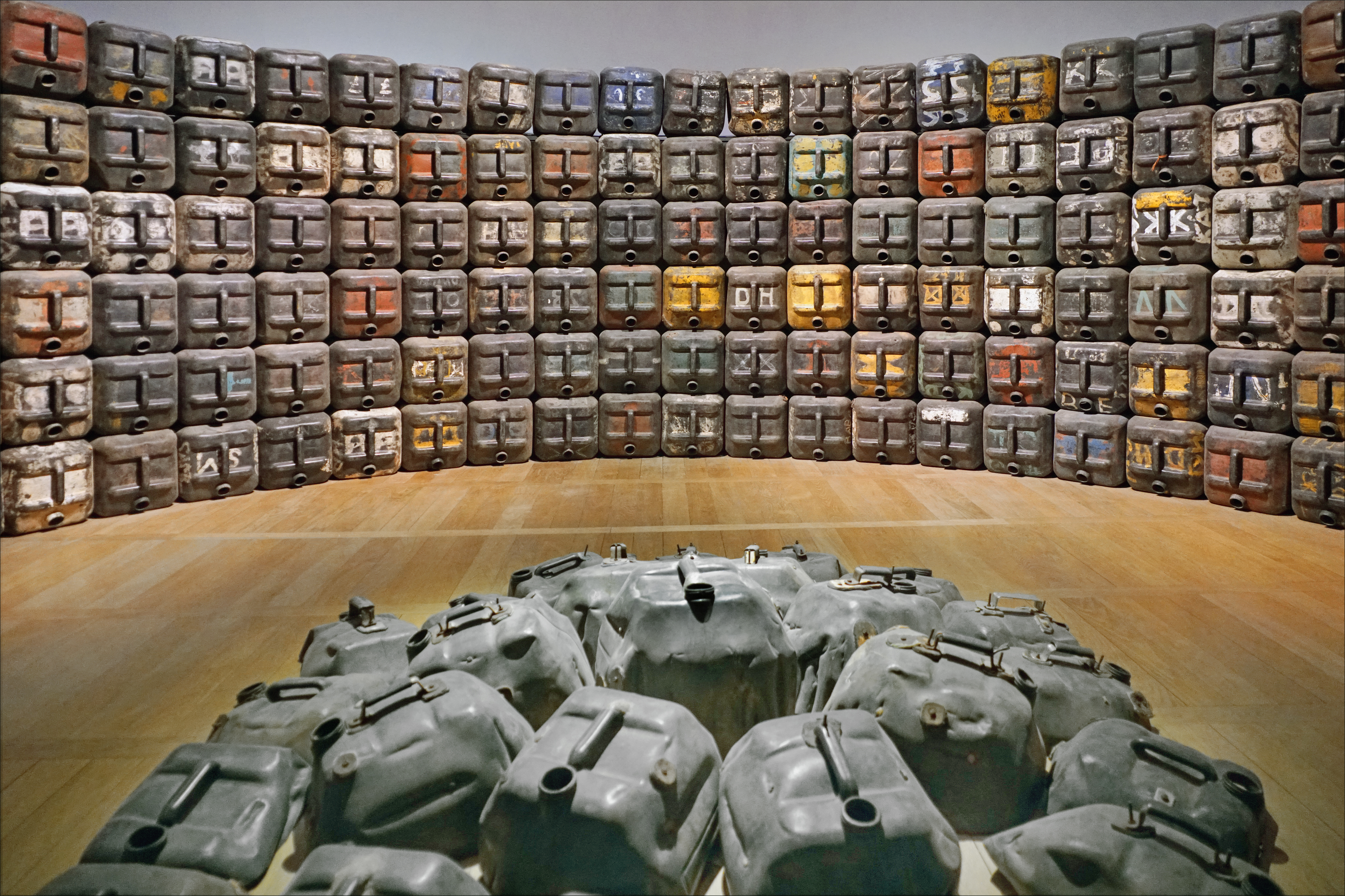
Installation by Romuald Hazoumè using gas cans. Hazoumè has stated: "I send back to the West that which belongs to them, that is to say, the refuse of consumer society that invades us every day."

Decoloniality (Spanish: decolonialidad) is a school of thought that aims to delink from Eurocentric knowledge hierarchies and ways of being in the world in order to enable other forms of existence on Earth. It critiques the perceived universality of Western knowledge and the superiority of Western culture, including the systems and institutions that reinforce such perceptions. Decolonial perspectives understand colonialism as the basis for the everyday function of capitalist modernity and of imperialism. As Jeffrey Herlihy-Mera notes, “decolonial thinking endeavors to disrupt the Eurocentric prescriptions regarding who counts as human and thus who is considered possible of producing a valid thought."

Decoloniality emerged as part of a South American movement examining the role of the European colonization of the Americas in establishing Eurocentric modernity/coloniality — according to Aníbal Quijano (1928-2018), who defined the term and its reach.

== Foundational principles ==
=== Coloniality of knowledge ===
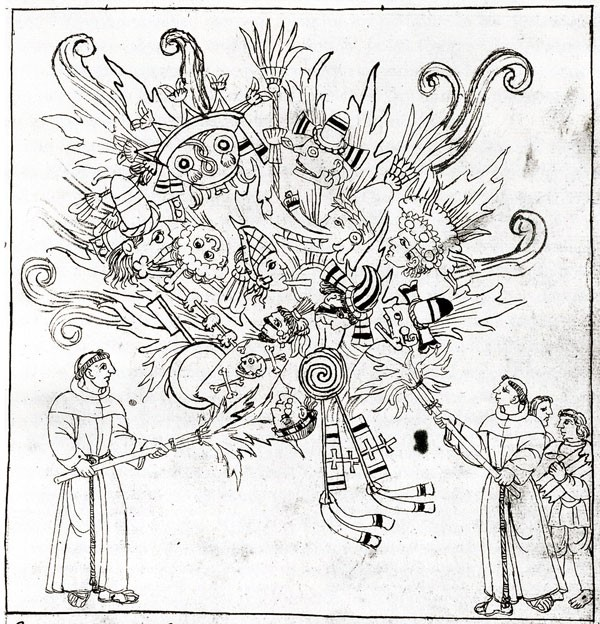
In his 1585 Descripción de Tlaxcala, Diego Muñoz Camargo illustrated the book burning of pre-Columbian codices by Franciscan friars.

Coloniality of knowledge is a concept that Peruvian sociologist Anibal Quijano developed and adapted to contemporary decolonial thinking. The concept critiques what proponents call the Eurocentric system of knowledge, arguing the legacy of colonialism survives within the domains of knowledge. For decolonial scholars, the coloniality of knowledge is central to the functioning of the coloniality of power and is responsible for turning colonial subjects into victims of the coloniality of being, a term that refers to the lived experiences of colonized peoples.

=== Coloniality of power ===
The coloniality of power is a concept interrelating the practices and legacies of European colonialism in social orders and forms of knowledge, advanced in decoloniality and Latin American subaltern studies, most prominently by Aníbal Quijano. It identifies and describes the living legacy of colonialism in contemporary societies in the form of social discrimination that outlived formal colonialism and became integrated in succeeding social orders. The concept identifies the racial, political and social hierarchical orders imposed by European colonialism in Latin America that prescribed value to certain peoples/societies while disenfranchising others.

=== Colonialism as the root ===
Decoloniality is founded on the principle that European colonialism is at the root of how the modern world functions today.

The decolonial movement includes diverse forms of critical theory, articulated by pluriversal forms of liberatory thinking that arise out of distinct situations. In its academic forms, it analyzes class distinctions, ethnic studies, gender studies, and area studies. It has been described as consisting of analytic (in the sense of semiotics) and practical "options confronting and delinking from [...] the colonial matrix of power" or from a "matrix of modernity" rooted in colonialism.

It considers colonialism "the underlying logic of the foundation and unfolding of Western civilization from the Renaissance to today," although this foundational interconnectedness is often downplayed. This logic is commonly referred to as the colonial matrix of power or coloniality of power. Some have built upon decolonial theory by proposing Critical Indigenous Methodologies for research.

=== Imperialism as the successor ===
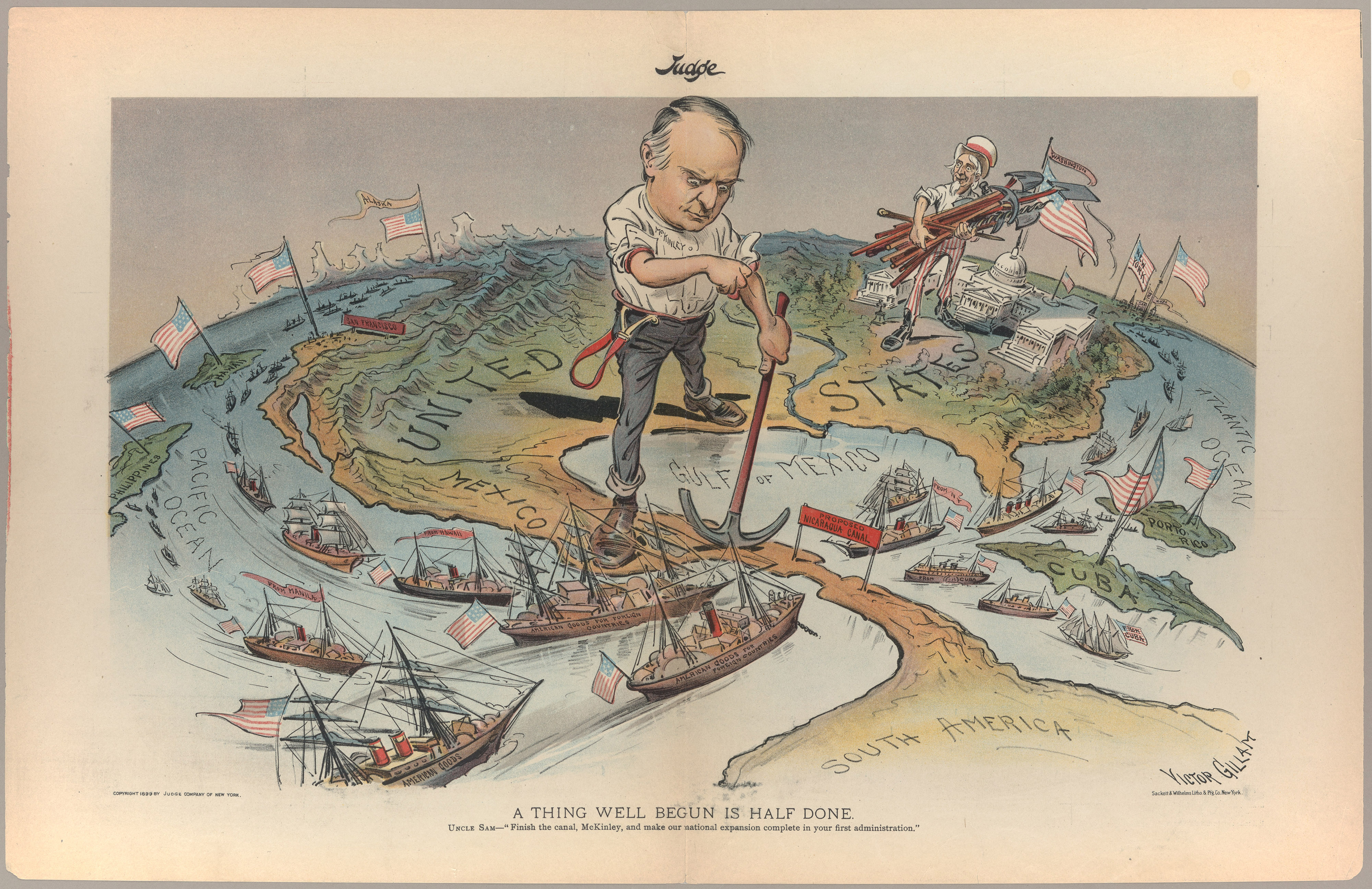
Decoloniality sees imperialism as a perpetuation of inequalities initiated by Western colonialism.

Although formal and explicit colonization ended with the decolonization of the Americas during the eighteenth and nineteenth century and the decolonization of much of the Global South in the late twentieth century, its successors, Western imperialism and globalization perpetuate those inequalities. The colonial matrix of power produced social discrimination eventually variously codified as racial, ethnic, anthropological or national according to specific historic, social, and geographic contexts. Decoloniality emerged as the colonial matrix of power was put into place during the 16th century. It is, in effect, a continuing confrontation of, and delinking from, Eurocentrism.

=== Coloniality of gender ===
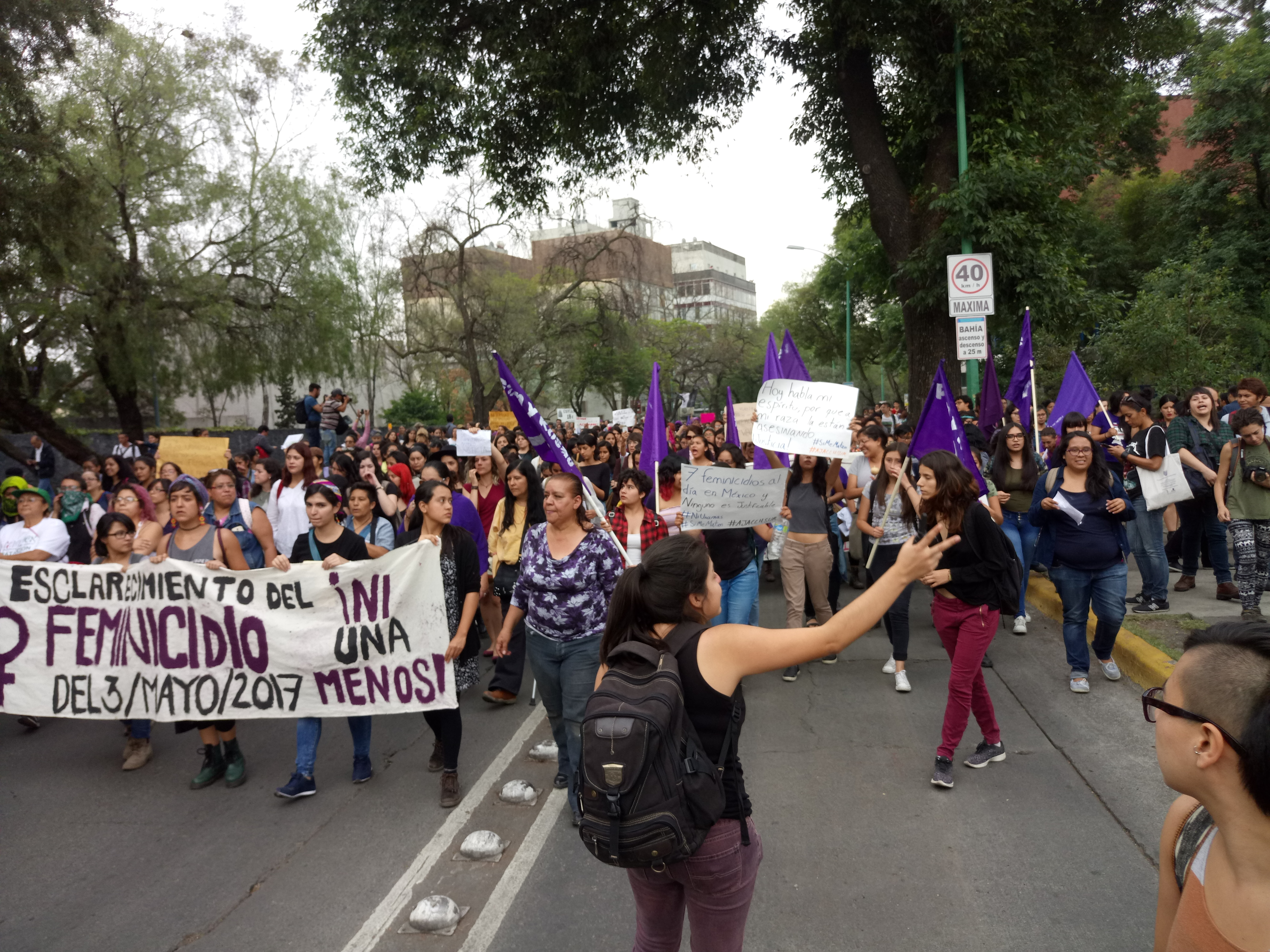
March against femicide at UNAM in 2017. The coloniality of gender has been used to explain how modern femicide is tied to the European colonization of the Americas.

Coloniality of gender is a concept developed by Argentine philosopher Maria Lugones. Building off Aníbal Quijano's foundational concept of coloniality of power, coloniality of gender explores how European colonialism influenced and imposed European gender structures on Indigenous peoples of the Americas. This concept challenges the notion that gender can be isolated from the impacts of colonialism.

Scholars have also extended the concept of coloniality of gender to describe colonial experiences in Asian and African societies. The concept is notably employed in academic fields like decolonial feminism and the broader study of decoloniality.

=== Disobedience and de-linking ===
Decoloniality has been called a form of "epistemic disobedience", "epistemic de-linking", and "epistemic reconstruction". The approach provides “a framework from which ‘new’ (presently existent but silent) realities may emerge and become institutionalized. Such an epistemic move does not concern specific material (that is, a list of specific books, poems, tweets to be taught, or any faculty demographics to be selected over others) but rather an intellectual process that gestures toward the validation of non-Eurocentric intellectual activities that enunciate community and individual sensibilities in localized ways." In this sense, decolonial thinking is the recognition and implementation of a border gnosis or subaltern, a means of eliminating the provincial tendency to pretend that Western European modes of thinking are universal. In less theoretical applications—such as movements for Indigenous autonomy—decoloniality is considered a program of de-linking from contemporary legacies of coloniality, a response to needs unmet by the modern Rightist or Leftist governments, or, most broadly, social movements in search of a "new humanity" or the search for "social liberation from all power organized as inequality, discrimination, exploitation, and domination".

== Decoloniality ==
Frantz Fanon and Aimé Césaire contributed to decolonial thinking, theory, and practice by identifying core principles of decoloniality. The first principle they identified is that colonialism must be confronted and treated as a discourse which fundamentally frames all aspects of thinking, organization, and existence. Framing colonialism as a "fundamental problem" empowers the colonized to center their experiences and thinking without seeking the recognition of the colonizer—a step towards the creation of decolonial thinking.

The second core principle is that decolonization goes beyond ending colonization. Nelson Maldonado-Torres explains, "For decolonial thinking decolonization is less the end of colonialism wherever it has occurred and more the project of undoing and unlearning the coloniality of power, knowledge, and being and of creating a new sense of humanity and forms of interrelationality." This is the work of the decolonial project that has epistemic, political, and ethical dimensions.

Aníbal Quijano summarized the goals of decoloniality as a need to recognize that the instrumentation of reason by the colonial matrix of power produced distorted paradigms of knowledge and spoiled the liberating promises of modernity, and by that recognition, realize the destruction of the global coloniality of power. Alanna Lockward explains that Europe has engaged in an intentional "politics of confusion" to conceal the relationship between modernity and coloniality.

Decoloniality is synonymous with decolonial "thinking and doing", and it questions or problematizes the histories of power emerging from Europe. These histories underlie the logic of Western civilization. Thus, decoloniality refers to analytic approaches and socioeconomic and political practices opposed to pillars of Western civilization: coloniality and modernity. This makes decoloniality both a political and epistemic project.

=== Examples ===
Examples of contemporary decolonial programmatics and analytics exist throughout the Americas. Decolonial movements include the contemporary Zapatista governments of Southern Mexico, Indigenous movements for autonomy throughout South America, ALBA, CONFENIAE in Ecuador, ONIC in Colombia, the TIPNIS movement in Bolivia, and the Landless Workers' Movement in Brazil. These movements embody action oriented towards the goals expressed to seek ever-increasing freedoms by challenging the reasoning behind modernity, since modernity is in fact a facet of the colonial matrix of power.

Examples of contemporary decolonial analytics include ethnic studies programs at various educational levels designed primarily to appeal to certain ethnic groups, including those at the K-12 level recently banned in Arizona, as well as long-established university programs. Scholars primarily with analytics who fail to recognize the connection between politics or decoloniality and the production of knowledge—between programmatics and analytics—are those claimed by decolonialists to most likely to reflect "an underlying acceptance of capitalist modernity, liberal democracy, and individualism" values which decoloniality seeks to challenge.

== Decolonial critique ==
Researchers, authors, creators, theorists, and others engage in decoloniality through essays, artwork, and media. Many of these creators engage in decolonial critique. In decolonial critique, thinkers employ the theoretical, political, epistemic, and social frameworks advanced by decoloniality to scrutinize, reformulate, and denaturalize often widely accepted and celebrated concepts. Many decolonial critiques focus on reformulating the concept of modernity as situated within colonial and racial frameworks. Decolonial critique may inspire a decolonial culture that delinks from reproducing Western hierarchies. Decolonial critique is a method of applying decolonial methods and practices to all facets of epistemic, social, and political thinking.

=== Decolonial art ===
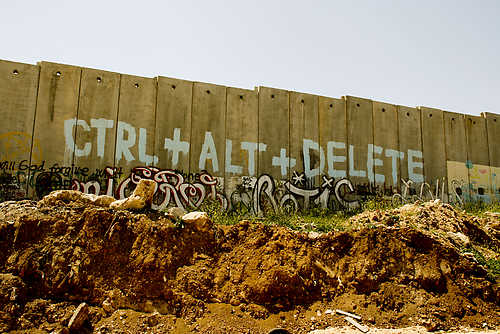
Graffiti on the Israeli West Bank barrier wall. Graffiti can function as an open or public challenge to colonial and imperialist structures.

Decolonial art critiques Western art, arguing it is alienated from the surrounding world and is focused on pursuing aesthetic beauty. Rather than feelings of sublime at the beauty of an art object, decolonial art seeks to evoke feelings of "sadness, indignation, repentance, hope, solidarity, resolution to change the world in the future, and, most importantly, with the restoration of human dignity." Decolonial aesthetics "seek to recognize and open options for liberating the senses" beyond just visual senses and challenge "the idea of art from Eurocentric forms of expression and philosophies of the beautiful."

Decolonial art may "re-inscribe indigeneity on the land" that has been obscured by colonialism and reveal alternatives or an "always elsewhere of colonialism." Decolonialists argue graffiti can function as an open or public challenge to colonial or imperialist structures and disrupt notions of a contented oppressed or colonized people.

Notable artists include:

- Kwame Akoto-Bamfo (Ghana): Creates sculptures and installations that reflect on the history of the Transatlantic Slave Trade and its impact on African communities.
- Maria Thereza Alves (Brazil): Focuses on Indigenous and environmental issues, shedding light on the impact of colonization on Indigenous communities.
- Wangechi Mutu (Kenya/United States): Explores African identities and the interplay between tradition and modernity in a postcolonial context through painting, collage, and sculpture.
- Tracey Moffatt (Australia): Examines identities, stories, and representations of Indigenous populations in Australia, focusing on colonial and postcolonial themes.
- Yinka Shonibare (United Kingdom/Nigeria): Utilizes African batik-printed fabrics and examines cultural identity, colonialism, and postcolonial issues through sculptures and installations.

=== Decolonial feminism ===
Decolonial feminism reformulates the coloniality of gender by critiquing the very formation of gender and its subsequent formations of patriarchy and the gender binary, not as universal constants across cultures, but as structures that have been instituted by and for the benefit of European colonialism. Marìa Lugones proposes that decolonial feminism speaks to how "the colonial imposition of gender cuts across questions of ecology, economics, government, relations with the spirit world, and knowledge, as well as across everyday practices that either habituate us to take care of the world or to destroy it." Decolonial feminists like Karla Jessen Williamson and Rauna Kuokkanen have examined colonialism as a force that has imposed gender hierarchies on Indigenous women that have disempowered and fractured Indigenous communities and ways of life.

=== Decolonial love ===
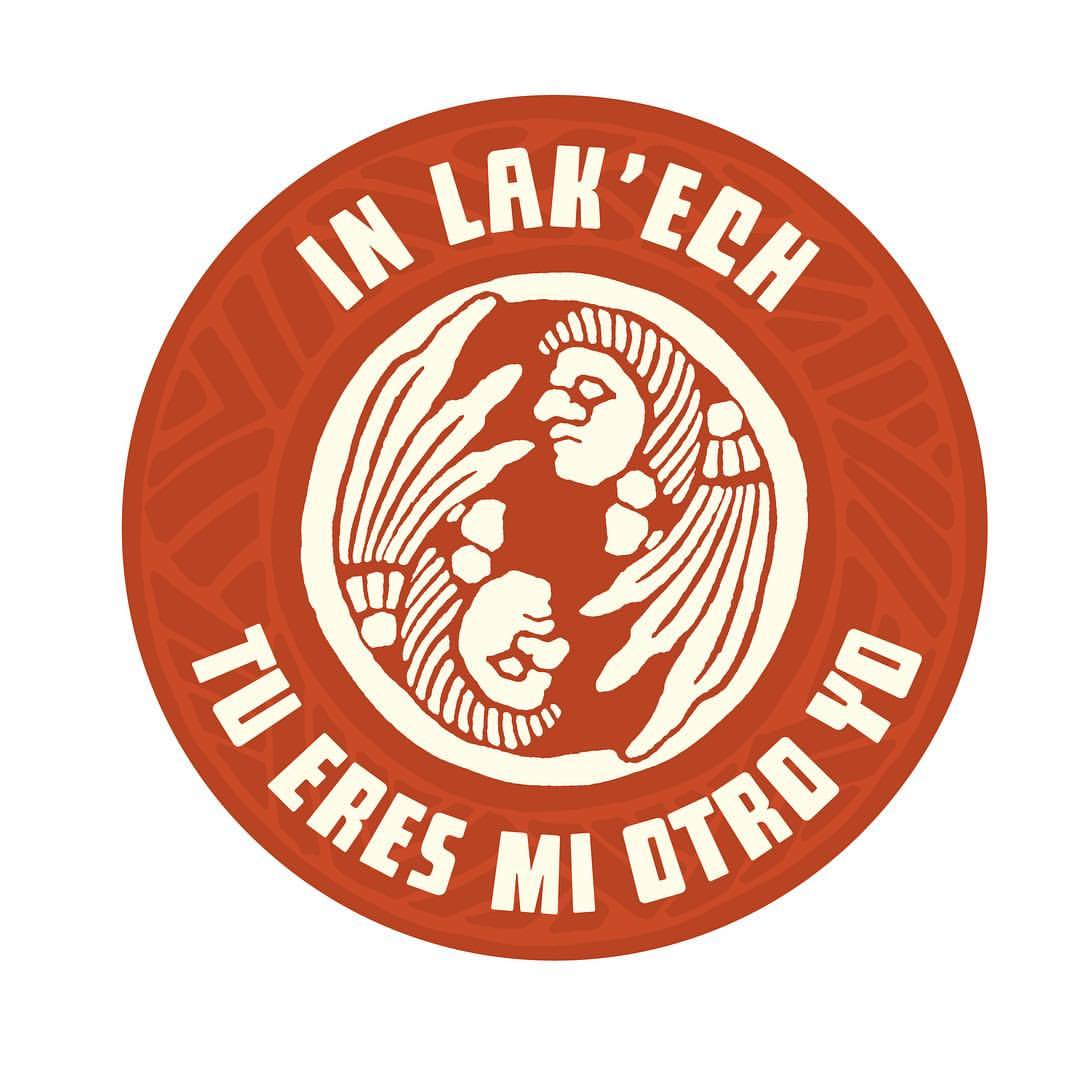
In Lak'ech has been referred to as a reflection of decolonial love.

Decolonial love is conceived by decolonialists as a love established on relationality that is directed toward the emancipation of community from the coloniality of power, including human and non-human beings. It was developed by Chicana feminist Chela Sandoval as a reformulation of love beyond individualist romantic notions of love. Decolonial love "demands a deep recognition of our humanity and mutual implacability in undoing colonial relations of power and oppression that lead to indifference, contempt, and dehumanization." It begins from within, as a love of one's humanity and for those who have resisted colonial violence in their pursuit of healing and liberation. Thinkers who speak to the concept state that it is rooted in Indigenous cosmologies, including In Lak'ech ("you are my other me"), where love is a relational and resisting act toward the coloniality of power.

=== Critiquing Western liberal democracy ===
Moving beyond the critiques of enlightenment philosophy and modernity, decolonial critiques of democracy allege that practices in democratic governance root themselves in colonial and racial rhetoric. Subhabrata Bobby Banerjee seeks to counter "hegemonic models of democracy that cannot address issues of inequality and colonial difference."

Banerjee critiques western liberal democracy: "In liberal democracies colonial power becomes the epistemic basis of a privileged Eurocentric position that can explain culture and define the realities and identities of marginalized populations, while eliding power asymmetries inherent in the fixing of colonial difference." He also extends this analysis against deliberative democracy, arguing that this political theory fails to take into account colonized forms of deliberation often discounted and silenced—including oral history, music production, and more—as well as how asymmetries of power are reproduced within political arenas.

== Distinction from related ideas ==
Decoloniality is often conflated with postcolonialism, decolonization, and postmodernism. However, decolonial theorists draw clear distinctions.

=== Postcolonialism ===
Postcolonialism is often mainstreamed into general oppositional practices by "people of color", "Third World intellectuals", or ethnic groups. Decoloniality—as both an analytic and a programmatic approach—is said to move "away and beyond the post-colonial" because "post-colonialism criticism and theory is a project of scholarly transformation within the academy".

This final point is debatable, as some postcolonial scholars consider postcolonial criticism and theory to be both an analytic (a scholarly, theoretical, and epistemic) project and a programmatic (a practical, political) stance. This disagreement is an example of the ambiguity—"sometimes dangerous, sometimes confusing, and generally limited and unconsciously employed"—of the term "postcolonialism," which has been applied to analysis of colonial expansion and decolonization, in contexts such as Algeria, the 19th-century United States, and 19th-century Brazil.

Decolonial scholars consider the colonization of the Americas a precondition for postcolonial analysis. The seminal text of postcolonial studies, Orientalism by Edward Said, describes the nineteenth-century European invention of the Orient as a geographic region considered racially and culturally distinct from, and inferior to, Europe. However, without the European invention of the Americas in the sixteenth century, sometimes referred to as Occidentalism, the later invention of the Orient would have been impossible. This means that postcolonialism becomes problematic when applied to post-nineteenth-century Latin America.

=== Political decolonization ===
Decolonization is largely political and historical: the end of the period of territorial domination of lands primarily in the global south by European powers. Decolonial scholars contend that colonialism did not disappear with political decolonization.

There are vast differences in the histories, socioeconomics, and geographies of colonization in its various global manifestations. However, coloniality— meaning racialized and gendered socioeconomic and political stratification according to an invented Eurocentric standard—was common to all forms of colonization. Similarly, decoloniality in the form of challenges to this Eurocentric stratification manifested previous to de jure decolonization. Gandhi and Jinnah in India, Fanon in Algeria, Mandela in South Africa, and the early 20th-century Zapatistas in Mexico are all examples of decolonial projects that existed before decolonization.

=== Postmodernism ===
"Modernity" as a concept is complementary to coloniality. Coloniality is called "the darker side of eastern modernity". colonialists believe the problematic aspects of coloniality are often overlooked when describing the totality of Western society, whose advent is instead often framed as the introduction of modernity and rationality, a concept critiqued by post-modern thinkers. However, this critique is largely "limited and internal to European history and the history of European ideas".

Although postmodern thinkers recognize the problematic nature of the notions of modernity and rationality, decolonialists claim these thinkers often overlook the fact that modernity as a concept emerged when Europe defined itself as the center of the world. They argue that in this sense, those seen as part of the periphery are themselves part of Europe's self-definition.

To summarize, the decolonialist critique is that, like modernity, postmodernity often reproduces the "Eurocentric fallacy" foundational to modernity. Therefore, rather than criticizing the terrors of modernity, decolonialism criticizes Eurocentric modernity and rationality because of the "irrational myth" that these conceal. Decolonial approaches thus seek to "politicise epistemology from the experiences of those on the 'border,' not to develop yet another epistemology of politics".

== Criticism ==
Jonatan Kurzwelly and Malin Wilckens used the example of decolonisation of academic collections of human remains collected during colonial times to support racist theories and give legitimacy to colonial oppression, and showed how both contemporary scholarly methods and political practice perpetuate reified and essentialist notions of identities.

Historian Frederick Cooper criticized some uses of decoloniality, writing that there is

good reason why we should now be thinking about colonization and decolonization yet thinking about them carefully. If colonialism is everywhere, it is nowhere. But it is somewhere. We need to be able to make clear both the persistent effects of the colonial past and its dangerous actuality... how far does the response “decolonize!” get us? Evoking the colonial emphasizes that powerlessness, poverty, sexism, racism, and cultural denigration are not inherent conditions of humankind but historically constructed, and that their undoing will also take place in time. But if we are to change power relations, we need to understand what they are, in all their complexity. Rulers and oppositions within states act within a matrix of possibilities and constraints, but as they do so, they change that matrix. To study these complexities is to look at the opening and closure of alternatives rather than inevitabilities, to focus more on trajectories than on legacies.

== See also ==
- Anti-imperialism
- Deconstruction
