= Coloniality of power =

Social theory of Latin America

The coloniality of power is a concept interrelating the practices and legacies of European colonialism in social orders and forms of knowledge, advanced in decoloniality and Latin American subaltern studies, most prominently by Aníbal Quijano. It identifies and describes the living legacy of colonialism in contemporary societies in the form of social discrimination that outlived formal colonialism and became integrated in succeeding social orders. The concept identifies the racial, political and social hierarchical orders imposed by European colonialism in Latin America that prescribed value to certain peoples/societies while disenfranchising others.

Quijano argues that the colonial structure of power resulted in a caste system, where Spaniards were ranked at the top and those that they conquered at the bottom due to their different phenotypic traits and a culture presumed to be inferior. This categorization resulted in a persistent categorical and discriminatory discourse that was reflected in the social and economic structure of the colony, and that continues to be reflected in the structure of modern postcolonial societies. Maria Lugones expands the definition of coloniality of power by noting that it imposes values and expectations on gender as well, in particular related to the European ranking of women as inferior to men.

The concept was also expanded upon by Ramón Grosfoguel, Walter Mignolo, Sylvia Wynter, Nelson Maldonado-Torres, Santiago Castro-Gómez, Catherine Walsh, Roberto Hernández, and María Lugones. Quijano's work on the subject "had wide repercussions among Latin American decolonial scholars in the North American academy." The Grupo modernidad/colonialidad modernity/coloniality group is an active network of intellectuals spanning generations and disciplines that are expanding on this work.

== Colonial logic ==
Colonial logic takes three forms: systems of hierarchies, systems of knowledge, and cultural systems.

The important distinction in the concept of coloniality of power is the ways that this heterogeneous structural process shaped the modern world. While modernity is certainly a European phenomenon, it was forged through and is constitutive of what Enrique Dussel has called "the invention of the Americas," or the colonization of the Americas beginning in 1492. Coloniality of power reveals the hidden side of modernity and the modern/colonial/capitalist-world system which is entangled with and constitutive of an international division of labor between Europeans and non-Europeans.

=== Systems of hierarchies ===
The systems of hierarchies posited by Quijano are systems based on racial classification and difference. Quijano writes that the creation of race was a calculated creation by European and American colonialists. In this racial structure inferiority and superiority was ascribed based on phenotypes and skin colors, which colonialists claimed to be innate biological traits. This system was the outcome of a Eurocentric view that reinforced the justification for the domination of Europeans, overriding the previously used gender-based domination systems. As Lugones points out, however, the gender-based domination system did not disappear, but was integrated into the race-based hierarchical domination system. The importance of the systems of hierarchies was not merely symbolic, but was instead economic. A racial division of labor was built around the hierarchies created, resulting in a system of serfdom for the majority of native people. Existing differences were exploited in the formation of these hierarchies. Quijano (p. 536) notes that: "In some cases, the Indian nobility, a reduced minority, was exempted from serfdom and received special treatment owing to their roles as intermediaries with the dominant race... However, blacks were reduced to slavery."

=== Systems of knowledge ===
Coloniality of power is based on a Eurocentric system of knowledge, in which race is seen as "naturalization of colonial relations between Europeans and non-Europeans. The Eurocentric system of knowledge assigned production of knowledge to Europeans and prioritized the use of European ways of knowledge production. Quijano writes, "Europe’s hegemony over the new model of global power concentrated all forms of the control of subjectivity, culture, and especially knowledge and the production of knowledge under its hegemony." This resulted in a simultaneous denial of knowledge production to the conquered peoples and repression of traditional modes of knowledge production, on the basis of the superiority/inferiority relationship enforced by the hierarchical structure.

=== Cultural systems ===
The third element of coloniality of power is the creation of cultural systems that revolve around a Eurocentric hierarchy and that enforce Eurocentric economic and knowledge production systems. The concept of coloniality of power as illustrated by Quijano, Grosfuguel and others describes the existing global neoliberal system of capital and labor and locates its roots in the racist, patriarchal logic of the colonial system. The cultural systems created under coloniality of power presume that European cultures are the only truly modern cultures, based on characteristics of modernity like capitalist economic systems, rationality, neoliberalism, and science. These cultural systems enforce Eurocentric norms through the use of the state and the economic system.

One example of this type of repression is the Chilean Mapuche culture, in which genders are interchangeable and combinable, not static and prescribed like in Chilean mainstream culture The enforcement of the gender binary by the state, which correlates the masculine with the political sphere and the feminine with the private sphere, has had the effect of repressing the Machi gender expression. Many Mapuche men now refuse to identify themselves using their native gender identity as a way to adapt to a heterosexual binary. Thus, a cultural system has been created by forced imposition of outside values that in opposition to existing values.

== Applications and modulations of the concept ==
Coloniality of power is one of a set of related concepts of coloniality, which according to Arturo Escobar describe a fundamental element of modernity and which can be applied to describe a global condition of coloniality. The concept has been expanded outside Latin America and used in understanding the construction of the American Latino ethnic category as a racialized minority in the case of Puerto Rican and Dominican ethnic groups in New York. Sonia Tascón uses the concept of coloniality of power to discuss Australian immigration and detention policy, referring specifically to the systems of knowledge and racialized hierarchy involved in constructing categories of difference between immigrants.

Anthropologist Brian Noble offers a modulation on the coloniality of power, when applied to the context of historic and ongoing Canadian settler colonialism and the dispossession of Indigenous peoples of that part of North America. Noble points to two entwined dimensions of action associated with the coloniality of power, one aligned "with colonial encounters across cultural difference inscribed upon persons", after the foundational work of Mary Louise Pratt, and the second with colonialism as both milieu and apparatus, after Agamben, Deleuze, Stengers. Discussing research relations in an Environmental Resource Inventory project in the Inuit territory of Nunavut, Noble illustrates how coloniality as encounter is based on the "modern opposition of the relation between a self and an other", where this colonizing "self" tends "to impose boundary coordinates—such as those of territory, knowledges, categories, normative practices—on the domains of land, knowledge, ways of life of an other who have had prior, principal relations with those lands, etc." This colonizing, often liberal self then rationalizes its actions to assure its impulse toward accumulation by dispossession. Noble then describes how coloniality, as a key working of modernity, also works as the embracing milieu or apparatus for coloniality as encounter. Following the enrolments of Inuit knowledges into dominant scientific practices, Noble demonstrates how this milieu sustains the other by maintaining a dialogue between the self and the other, so "always ensuring by whatever flexible means, that the other remains other, partially welcomed into the arrangement but necessarily in a subordinate position, subjugated, inscribed as other by self, thereby securing the power position of self" in a culturally resilient, yet continuously oppressive way. A decolonial solution to this "double bind" of coloniality, Noble contends and referring especially to the work of Michael Asch, is a robust "praxis of treaty" in action, which simultaneously redresses domination through encounter, and domination through political relations between peoples, undoing the usual relations of power.

Media and digital culture scholar Paola Ricaurte presents a theoretical lens through which to interrogate the coloniality of power, specifically as it pertains to the data epistemologies of digital technology. According to Ricaurte, the colonial rationality of these data relations represents a “complex evolution of the post-positivist paradigm” and thus acts in continuity with historical forms of colonization, manufacturing and colonizing social relations in ways that “crowd out alternative forms of being, thinking, and sensing."

== See also ==
- Coloniality of gender
- Colonisation
- Decoloniality
- Decolonization of knowledge
- Gender
- Gender binary
- Indigeneity
- Third World
