= Mexican American Studies Department Programs, Tucson Unified School District =

Educational program

The Mexican American Studies Department Programs (MAS) provide courses for students attending various elementary, middle, and high schools within the Tucson Unified School District (TUSD). Some key components of the MAS program include student support, curriculum content, teacher professional development, and parent and community involvement. In the past, programs helped Chicana/o and Latina/o students graduate, pursue higher education, and score higher test scores. A study found that "100 percent of those students enrolled in Mexican-American studies classes at Tucson High were graduating, and 85 percent were going on to college."

The program was targeted by politicians like Tom Horne, who wrote Arizona House Bill 2281 that was signed into law by the governor of Arizona, Jan Brewer in 2010, which effectively banned the program. The ban was ultimately ruled unconstitutional in 2017. The ban of the programs also inspired educators in California and Texas to introduce ethnic studies into schools.

== History ==
The Mexican American Studies Department Programs in the Tucson Unified School District was established in 1998 by high school teacher, Curtis Acosta, in an effort to help Chicano/a and Latino/a students reach their full potentials. The department grew from offering a few classes at the beginning to about 43 classes in the years following. Within the Tucson school district, students were eligible to take the allotted courses throughout grades K-12. The program was designed to motivate students to engage and participate more effectively in school in order to raise the statistically low graduation rates of the Hispanic community. The Hispanic dropout rate in the MAS program was 2.5%, which is lower than the national average of 56%. Though the program was banned by an Arizona state law in 2010, there has been resistance from the Hispanic community along with the student youth and those effected. Since the ban, the opposition has gained ground in the reinstatement of the Mexican American Studies Program through various court rulings. In recent years, Mexican American Studies programs have spread throughout the country and into college universities. Mexican American classes are being offered in different disciplines in other states with wide-ranged Latino/a communities. The newly integrated programs are promoting original goals while providing all students with new perspectives about Mexican American history and culture.

== Vision and Goals ==
The purpose of the classes were to enable students the opportunity to engage in a learning-based community, specifically encouraging students to become leaders while understanding and appreciating Mexican American culture, both past and present. The goals were to have a culturally relevant curriculum that can relate to student justice work, encourage student activism, promote critical thinking, and develop awareness for social issues. The overall vision of the MAS program is to help students create a sense of identity while providing the opportunity for student youth to more deeply relate to the culture and environment they are a product of.

== Demographics ==
In 2011, over 1,300 students were enrolled in the program. According to an audit conducted by Cambium Learning, the racial breakdown of the students was 90% Hispanic, 5% White/Anglo, 2% Native American, 1.5% African American, and about 0.5% Asian American and Multi-Racial. In the English Journal article “Developing Critical Consciousness: Resistance literature in a Chicano Literature class,” Curtis Acosta, MAS curriculum teacher, states that at Tucson High Magnet School 60 percent of students are Chicano/a or Latino/a students, and the European-American student population is 28 percent.

== Curriculum ==
In the English Journal article “Developing Critical Consciousness: Resistance literature in a Chicano Literature class,” Curtis Acosta, a teacher and creator of the Mexican American Studies curriculum, outlines the class curriculum he used while teaching at Tucson High Magnet School. The classes in Chicano Studies/Literature as well as Raza Studies could be taken instead of American History and Junior high school English. The department "uses Chicano to refer to the Mexican American experience within the United States and raza, a more inclusive term that represents the entire human race". The curriculum used in the junior class of the program is based on indigenous philosophy using the Xicano paradigm. This paradigm has four key concepts: Tezkatlipoka, Quetzalkoatl, Huitzilopochtli, and Xipe Totek. Tezkatlipoka is a concept about self reflection and finding one's inner self. Quetzalkoatl is learning one's history and how that shapes who someone is. Huitzilopochtli is based on the will to act and be “positive, progressive, and creative”. Xipe Totek is the concept of being able to reshape one's self and be renew. Acosta states that the senior year high school classes follow the same paradigm and expand on it to incorporate more of a social justice aspect that relate specifically to “challenging mainstream assumptions and stereotypes” by teaching students the counter-narrative. Acosta states that the most important part of the curriculum is the “ability to loop with the same students in successive years”. The use of this curriculum Acosta expresses “is crucial for students to...discover their humanity and academic identity”. A part of the curriculum was also that students were required to go to community events. Additionally, the teachers tried to engage and collaborate with parents.

=== High school ===
The classes offered for high school students through the Mexican American Studies Department were American Government/Social Justice Education Project, American History/Mexican American Perspectives, Beginning and Advanced Chicano/a Art, and Latino Literature. These classes involved analyzing government, researching problems that students face in school and coming up with solutions that were then presented to policy makers. Additionally, students engaged with history that included a variety of experiences, perspectives, and contributions, specifically those of Mexican Americans, that often were left out of other United States history courses. Art skills were developed while using content for artwork based around social justice issues. Students were encouraged to be active learners by engaging with literature through discussions, projects, writings, and readings.

== Controversy ==
Since 2006, this program was under attack by Tom Horne who also attempted to ban the program in 2008 and 2009, gaining widespread student and community protests as well as media attention despite his unsuccessful efforts. On May 11, 2010, the governor of Arizona, Jan Brewer, signed into law Arizona House Bill 2281. The bill was written by Arizona's superintendent of public instruction, Tom Horne, stating the terms that no program: "1. Promote the overthrow of the United States government 2. Promote resentment toward a race or class of people 3. Are designed primarily for pupils of a particular ethnic group 4. Advocate ethnic solidarity instead of the treatment of pupils as individuals". The bill came into effect on January 1, 2011, with the original intention to completely get rid of the Mexican American Studies Department programs, threatening that the teachings were not in accordance with the new law which would consequently result in the loss of ten percent of a certain school districts funding. Consequently, in a court hearing with the Tucson Unified School District on December 27, 2011, the decision was made that the MAS Program did not abide by the new law. Then, on January 10, 2012, the school board voted to end the Mexican American Studies courses. Additionally, the court ruling on December 27, 2011, deemed seven books in the MAS program to be in conflict with the law. These books were only removed from the MAS program, so only the program's teachers and students were prohibited from using these banned books.

=== After HB 2281 ===
In 2012, the Tucson Unified School District decided to bring about the Mexican American Student Services. These services do not involve classes, but rather help address the achievement gap for Latino students. Students and teachers who had been a part of the Mexican American Studies Department Programs appealed the ruling that the program should be eliminated. In July 2013, a federal court decided that culturally relevant courses should be in place in the TUSD, specifically Mexican American Studies and African American Studies, in order to comply with desegregation. On October 22, 2013, the school board voted to allow the seven books to be taught in the schools again. As of May 2013, TUSD students can study Mexican American Studies through a class called CLASS (Chicano Literature, Art and Social Studies) offered at a college in Tucson. The students can earn college credit and can take the class for free.

Students who had participated in the Mexican American Studies Department classes brought a lawsuit against the officials who had shut down the program. Oral arguments were heard on January 12, 2015, and a ruling on the case by the United States Court of Appeal for the Ninth Circuit was made on July 7, 2015. This ruling stated that the law banning ethnic studies classes in Arizona is not broad and vague as plaintiffs argued. However, the ongoing case was also sent to the lower Arizona district court in Tucson because there was enough evidence suggesting the law was “motivated at least in part by a discriminatory intent”.

On August 22, 2017, Judge A. Wallace Tashima ruled that the Tucson Unified School District had violated the students' First and Fourteenth Amendment rights by eliminating the Mexican American Studies Program in Tucson's public schools. Since the ban of the Mexican American studies program had deprived the students of certain knowledge, Judge Tashima found the Tucson Unified School District had interfered with the students' First Amendment right. The judge further ruled that former superintendent Tom Horne, who initiated the campaign to remove the program, along with other school officials, were motivated by racial bias and thereby violated the students' Fourteenth Amendment right.

Following this ruling, TUSD was required to form new classes to meet the needs of Latino students. Superintendent John Pedicone promised that the new program would not involve the MAS program's staff or curriculum in any way.

=== Books Banned Due to HB 2281 ===
The following books were ordered to be boxed and carried off from MAS classes, in some cases in front of students, by the Tucson Unified School District following HB 2281:

- 500 Years of Chicano History in Pictures by Elizabeth Martinez
- Critical Race Theory by Richard Delgado & Jean Stefancic
- Message to Aztlán: Selected Writings of Rodolfo “Corky” Gonzalez by Rodolfo Gonzales
- Chicano! The History of the Mexican American Civil Rights Movement by Arturo Rosales
- Rethinking Columbus by Bill Bigelow and Bob Peterson
- Pedagogy of the Oppressed by Paulo Freire
- The History of the Mexican American Civil Rights Movement by Arturo Rosales

While TUSD claimed that only the seven titles on the above list were ordered to be confiscated and, effectively, banned, other books were also removed from MAS classrooms, such as Mexican WhiteBoy by Matt de la Peña. Those books not officially listed in the ban have been referred to by Roberto Cintli Rodriguez as "undocumented books." Readings of an excerpt of Luis Valdez's poem Pensamiento Serpentino, which references the Mayan philosophical concept of In Lak'ech ("you are the other me"), were also banned. According the website bannedbooksweek.org, The Words of Cesar Chavez and The Tempest by W. Shakespeare were banned, too.

== See also ==
- Tupac Enrique Acosta
- Xicanx Institute for Teaching & Organizing
