= Mexican WhiteBoy =

2008 novel by Matt de la Peña

- Author: Matt de la Peña
- Language: English
- Genre: Young adult fiction
- Publisher: Delacorte Press
- Publication date: August 12, 2008
- ISBN: 9780440239383

Mexican WhiteBoy is a 2008 novel by Matt de la Peña, published by Delacorte Press. De la Peña drew on his own adolescent passion for sports in developing his main character Danny, a baseball enthusiast. The novel, which is set in National City, California, uses Spanglish and has a bicultural theme.

== Plot ==
Danny Lopez, the protagonist, is a shy and introverted young teenager from San Diego who attends Leucadia Prep. Danny is bi-ethnic, Mexican and white. He sometimes feels inadequate around both Mexican and white people because he is "a shade darker than the white kids" and "pale...a full shade lighter" than his Mexican family members. He also does not speak Spanish. The summer before his junior year, he goes to stay with his cousin Sofia and Uncle Tommy in National City, while his mom and sister move to San Francisco with his mom's new boyfriend. Throughout the summer, Danny becomes friends with Sofia's friends and the other kids in her neighborhood.

While hanging with Sofia's crew, Danny meets Uno, a biracial kid from the neighborhood. Uno is Black and Mexican, and struggles with some of the same identity issues as Danny. While playing a stickball derby in the neighborhood, Danny joins and proceeds to beat them at their own game. While playing, Danny sees a baseball scout he saw at Leucadia Prep during baseball try-outs. On the last hit, Danny accidentally hits Uno's mentally disabled little brother Manny in the face. Combining this with the fact that Uno was already losing the game, he becomes very upset, leading him to punch Danny, knocking him down. Danny hits his head on the concrete and requires stitches.

A couple weeks later, Uno watches Danny practicing his pitching at a run-down field nearby. He joins Danny, eventually apologizing. Uno tells Danny that his dad invites him to come live with him and his wife and daughter in Oxnard, he just needs Uno to make $500 first. Uno devises a plan to where he and Danny can hustle some baseball players for money. They decide to hustle some local baseball player from San Diego high schools by challenging the hitters to get a hit off Danny's pitching. The first time they try this hustle, Danny gets nervous and chokes, losing Uno's money.

Danny gets a phone call from his mother in San Francisco, who tells him about the superficial beauty of the city and how she and Julia, his sister, are enjoying themselves with Randy, his mom's boyfriend. After some time, his mother begins to cry to him about how she feels lonely in San Francisco and misses Danny and their home in Leucadia. She shares that Randy is going to send him two tickets to the San Diego Padres game and she will get him at the end of the week.

At the game, Danny and Uno call for hot dog but Danny recognizes the hot dog slinger. The slinger slowly backs away while Danny then tells Uno he'll be back with hot dogs. As he pursues the hot dog slinger, they end up in a back room, where Danny asks why a baseball scout would be a hot dog concessions worker. The guy explains that he works there and is not a baseball scout. He shares with Danny that his dad saved his life while they were in prison together, and told him to keep an eye on Danny. Danny is completely shocked by this revelation. Once he gets back home, he begins cutting himself in the bathroom. Sofia yells for him to open the door as he tries to clean himself up. When he finally does, she sees the bloodied cut and bathroom sink. She consoles him, telling him it is not his fault his dad is in prison.

Before Danny goes back home, he and Uno attempt one last hustle, this time at Leucadia Prep, against Kyle Sorenson, one of the best baseball players Danny knows. While there, Kyle's teammates throw different racial slurs at Uno, raising tension between the two sides. Danny throws his best pitches, but after several foul balls, Kyle hits the ball into right field. Uno challenges them to double or nothing, and Kyle hits a home run. Following the tension between both sides, one of Kyle's teammates hits Uno. Danny rushes him and punches him twice. The entire group gets in a scuffle and someone grabs Danny. Danny tries to fight him, only for Kyle to stop him. Kyle praises Danny's pitching, then tells the two to leave.

Sofia throws a farewell dinner for Danny, and the group reflects on their summer. Sofia reveals she will be staying at Danny's house to improve her chances of going to college. Uno takes Danny back to the train tracks. Uno offers to take Danny to the prison where his dad is. The two stay at the train tracks and watch the sun rise.

== Reception ==
A New York Times reviewer described de la Peña's characterization of Danny as "remarkably human", and his treatment of the themes of self-discovery as "never corny, sentimental or sappy."

The novel's use of Spanglish sets it apart from other young adult novels, making English-speaking "readers . . . feel like outsiders among the hard-edged kids of National City," a reviewer for The School Library Journal noted. However, with time, the reviewer added, "[the characters'] language starts to feel familiar and warm." Rohrlick, for Kliatt, was also impressed with de la Peña's "terrific dialogue" and his use of "street slang". Reviewers recommend the novel for "mixed race" readers. The issues of biculturalism in Mexican WhiteBoy and other works were the subject of a conference presentation by the author at the University of Arizona's 2010 Tucson Festival of Books.

== Controversy ==
On January 1, 2012, Mexican WhiteBoy was among a number of books banned in Tucson as part of an initiative to ban Mexican American Studies Department Programs in the Tucson Unified School District. State officials claimed the book contained "critical race theory", which they deemed as "promoting racial resentment". Some students and their parents sued the authorities, claiming that when the Tucson Unified School District banned the Mexican American studies program, they were violating their rights under the First and 14th amendments. In August 2017, A. Wallace Tashima, a federal judge, ruled that on both counts, the students and parents had their rights violated.

== Awards ==
- 2009, ALA-YALSA Best Book for Young Adults (Top 10 Pick)
- 2009–2010, Texas TAYSHAS Reading list
- 2011, Junior Library Guild Selection
- 2012, Lincoln Award nominee
