= Nahui Ollin =

Concept in 16th-century Aztec/Mexica cosmology

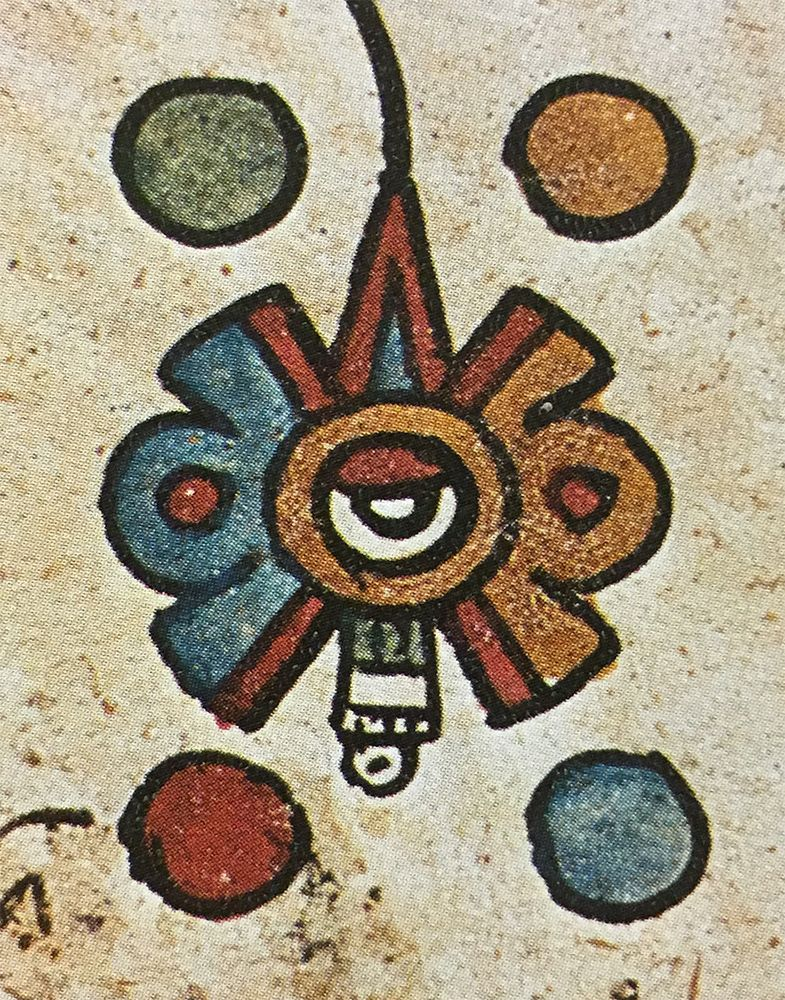
Nahui Ollin symbol with an eye (ixtli) in the center. A solar ray and a precious stone (chalchihuitl) emanate from the eye, Codex Borbonicus (1519–1521)

Nahui Ollin is a 16th-century concept in Aztec/Mexica cosmology with a variety of meanings. Nahui translates to "four," and Ollin translates to "movement" or "motion." Ollin was primarily portrayed in Aztec codices as two interlaced lines, each portrayed with two central ends. Nahui Ollin has been used as an educational framework, particularly in social justice and ethnic studies institutions.

== Philosophy ==
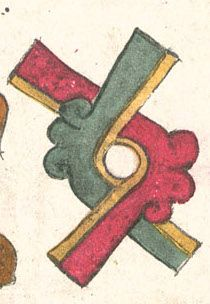
Symbol for Ollin (movement), Codex Borgia (16th century CE)

The concept is also described as alluding to the four preceding suns or ages in history. Nahui Ollin has been described as the fifth sun over our current world and as "the sun (Tōnatiuh) in its four movements." When the fourth sun ended, Nahui Ollin emerged "from the remnant matter of an earlier age of humanity." It is believed that Quetzalcoatl traveled to Mictlān (the underworld or the land of the dead) to gather bones from the previous age and initiate a process of rebirthing humanity after its previous catastrophic end. According to sources describing Aztec belief, the fifth world will be destroyed through a series of catastrophic earthquakes or one large earthquake that will lead to a period of famine and darkness.

Nahui Ollin is also described as referring to the four directions, although not being limited to these directions in a static or rigid way. Scholar Gabriel S. Estrada states that "as cosmic movement, ollin is all movements at once that are both orderly and chaotic. Paradoxically, it defies human understanding even as it motivates all human movement."

== Educational framework ==
Nahui Ollin has been adopted as an educational framework by various social justice and ethnic studies institutions to guide students through a process of "reflection, action, reconciliation, and transformation." Utilizing the framework has been described as an effective way to combat historical trauma, particularly for Chicano and Latino students. Educators at the Xicanx Institute for Teaching & Organizing describe the concept as follows:

The Nahui Ollin represents the cyclical movement of nature with respect to the four directions. The Nahui Ollin is a fundamental concept in Aztec/Mexica cosmology, a guide for everyday life and decisions. The objective is to constantly strive for balance, even when there is struggle. The Nahui Ollin uses cultural concepts representing community, knowledge, education, will power, transformation, and most importantly, self-reflection. The Nahui Ollin is composed of traditional Aztec ideologies, including the concepts of Tezcatlipoca, Quetzalcoatl, Huitzilopochtli, and Xipe Totec. The Nahui Ollin is used as a culturally responsive method of teaching and ultimately supporting the development of harmony and balance of the mind, body, spirit, and community.

=== Tezcatlipoca ===
In educational framework, Tezcatlipoca represents self-reflection, "silencing the distractions and obstacles in our lives, in order to become intellectual warriors." Tupac Enrique Acosta describes Tezcatlipoca as "a reflection, a moment of reconciliation of the past with the possibilities of the future... It is the 'Smoking Mirror' into which the individual, the family, the clan, the barrio, the tribe and the nation must gaze to acquire the sense of history that calls for liberation." Scholar Martín Sean Arce describes this as "a process to regain the historical memory at the individual and community collective levels, which leads to individual and community liberation." This process of coming to know oneself through an Indigenous epistemology has been notably successful among Xicana/o youth in leading them to "embrace their identities and foster their academic success."

=== Quetzalcoatl ===
Quetzalcoatl is both the end and the beginning, and is described by scholar Curtis Acosta as representing "precious and beautiful knowledge... [and the need to] listen to each other with humility, respect, and love in order to become mature human beings who walk in beauty." Arce states that this involves the work of guiding students through "critically analyzing the social realities that are steeped in their collective historical memory," and from this positionality being able to form what Emma Pérez describes as a "decolonial imaginary" which will allow them to transform their realities. Tupac Enrique Acosta describes Quetzalcoatl as follows: "From the memory of our identity, the knowledge of our collective history, we draw the perspective that draws us to the contemporary reality [and] from this orientation we achieve stability [to become] a mature human being."

=== Huitzilopochtli ===
Huitzilopochtli represents the will to act, encouraging students "to act with a spirit that is positive, progressive, and creative." The willingness to act is described by Tupac Enrique Acosta as essential to the physical act of survival and the work of sustaining oneself through self-discipline, which provides "a means of maximizing the energy resources available at the human command which - in order to have their full effect, - must be synchronized with the natural cycles." Arce describes that Huitzilopochtli "as praxis, presents students with the will and courage to enact their positive, progressive, and creative capacities to create change for themselves as well as for their community."

=== Xipe Totec ===
Xipe Totec represents transformation, which is described as the ultimate purpose of the Nahui Ollin educational framework. Transformation is the need to "have the strength to discard what hurts us [in order to] identify what will help us make progress and move forward." Xipe Totec was described by Tupac Enrique Acosta as "the source of strength that allows us to transform and renew. We can achieve this transformation only when we have learned to trust in ourselves." This brings together all three preceding concepts, in which transformation is a central aspect. Arce states that "transformations must be embraced and not resisted, the former ways of being and knowing must be shed, and new ways of being and knowing must be embraced, for to resist these transformations is to remain static and not develop, to be left behind, to be unevolving and out of sync with the natural lifecycles."
