= Coloniality of gender =

Decolonial theory

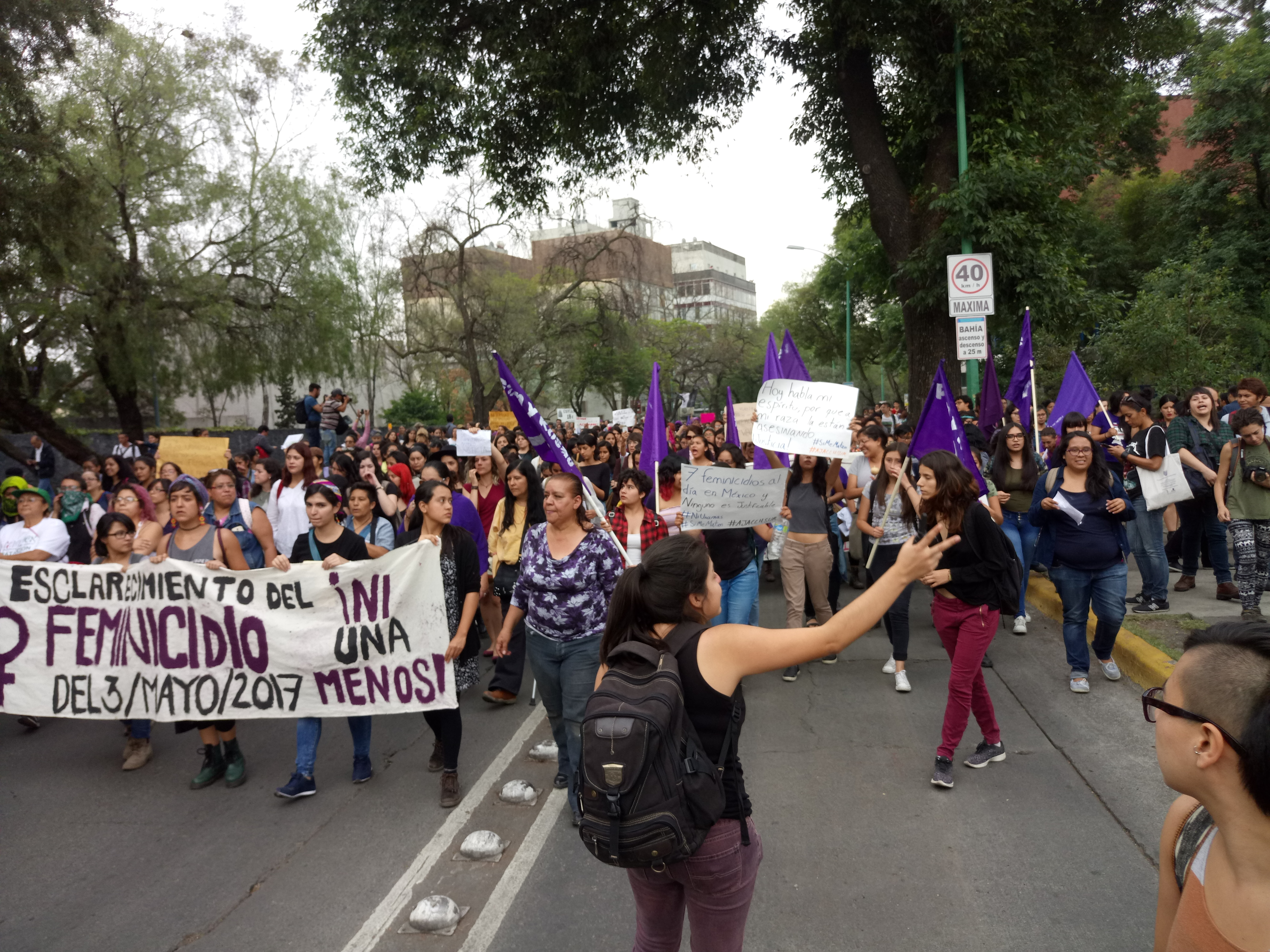
March against femicide at UNAM in 2017. The coloniality of gender has been used to explain how modern femicide is tied to the European colonization of the Americas.

Coloniality of gender was developed by Argentine philosopher Maria Lugones. Building off Aníbal Quijano's foundational concept of coloniality of power, coloniality of gender explores how European colonialism influenced and imposed European gender structures on Indigenous peoples of the Americas. This concept challenges the notion that gender can be isolated from the impacts of colonialism.

Scholars have also extended the concept of coloniality of gender to describe colonial experiences in Asian and African societies. The concept is notably employed in academic fields like decolonial feminism and the broader study of decoloniality.

== Gender effects ==
Coloniality of gender examines how colonialism impacts both women and men. Maria Lugones, Yuderkys Espinosa-Miñoso, and Nelson Maldonado-Torres argue that the coloniality of gender aimed at disrupting Indigenous people's connections with each other and the land, asserting that the core idea of European colonialism was exploiting the earth for the benefit of man. Rosalba Icaza adds that "Lugones helps us to understand the historical moment in which this specific system (sex/gender) became a form of subjugation [for colonized peoples]."

=== Women ===
For Indigenous women, European gender impositions may have normalized the idea that women's subordination was an essential part of being civilized like Europeans. This is in contrast to Indigenous cultures prior to colonization, which often "adopted matrilineal inheritance and matrilocal culture as their norm rather than the exception". Shannon Frediani argues that "many Indigenous cultures before colonialism had forms of governance recognizing women's participation, their knowledge, and centrality in some spiritual orientations" that ended with the coloniality of gender. Other societies had a "low-intensity patriarchy" that was intensified significantly by European colonialism. Chiara Bottici argues that recognizing these histories allows for reflection on the universality modern, colonial systems, including gender roles. Egla Salazar argues that the adoption of patriarchal systems that forced women's subordination normalized femicide against Indigenous women, such as in the Mayan genocide. In the modern day, some scholars including Lugones argue that white feminists often ignore or deny the subordination of non-white women in colonial societies, as well the long-term impacts of colonialism.

Further, Tlostanova argues that European gender impositions normalized the hyper-sexualization of non-white women and the sexual violence directed toward them. Non-white women were regarded as sexually available, seductive, and willing to be raped, threatening white women's happiness and well-being. Chavez Jr. argues that the idea of "woman" was not extended to African and Indigenous women in the same way that it was to white women, because non-white women were judged as excessively sexual, sinful and promiscuous, as opposed to the sexual chastity of European colonial women. This lack of feminine morality dehumanized African and Indigenous women, leading them to be sexually codified as female but lacking feminine character.

Conversely, Wardhani argues that Asian women in colonized societies were viewed as more passive, family-oriented and demure than white women.

=== Men ===
For non-Western men, the imposition of European gender norms may have shifted the ideal of manliness into being a white European landowner. Egla Salazar argues that the residual effects of this history may still be felt in communities today with men conforming to European ideas of what it means to be a man. DiPietro et al. suggest that men of colonized societies were often feminized, particularly in Oriental contexts, due to their lack of power. On the other hand, colonized males could be viewed as a threat at the slightest hint of agency, particularly in African and some Amerindian contexts. Under such circumstances, colonized men would be presented as aggressive animals, threats to the purity of both white women and colonized women, who would be viewed as needing rescuing from their males.

== Gender variance ==
Coloniality of gender has been used to understand the erasure and violence against people referred to as occupying a third gender by Western anthropologists in the Americas through European colonialism.

Alexander I. Stingl states that the concept challenges the lens of LGBTQ identities and argues for greater recognition of variation in gender, sexuality, and sexuality practices.
