= Maria Lugones =

Argentine feminist philosopher (1944–2020)

María Lugones
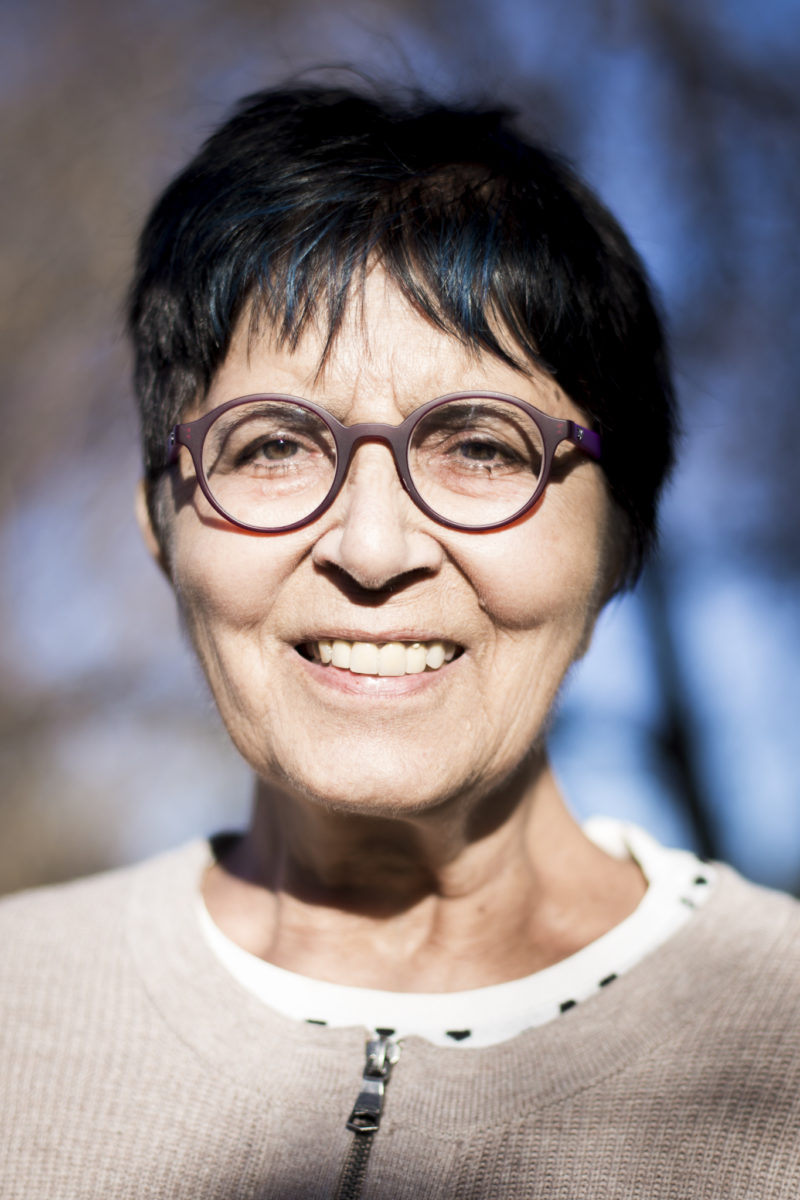
- Born: María Cristina Lugones; January 26, 1944; Buenos Aires, Argentina
- Died: July 14, 2020 (aged 76); Syracuse, New York, U.S.

Education
- Education: University of California (BA); University of Wisconsin (MA, PhD)

Philosophical work
- Era: 20th-century philosophy; 21st-century philosophy
- Region: Western philosophy
- School: Feminist philosophy
- Main interests: Decolonial feminism
- Notable works: Pilgrimages/Peregrinajes: Theorizing Coalition Against Multiple Oppressions (2003)
- Notable ideas: Coloniality of gender

María Cristina Lugones (January 26, 1944 – July 14, 2020) was an Argentine feminist philosopher, activist, and Professor of Comparative Literature and of women's studies at Carleton College in Northfield, Minnesota and at Binghamton University in New York State. She identified as a U.S-based woman of color and theorized this category as a political identity forged through feminist coalitional work.

Lugones advanced Latino philosophy in theorizing various forms of resistance against multiple oppressions in Latin America, the US and elsewhere. She was known for her theory of multiple selves, her work on decolonial feminism, and for developing the concept of the "coloniality of gender", which posits that gender is a colonial imposition.

== Education and career ==
Lugones earned her BA from the University of California in 1969. She also received a master's degree in 1973 and a PhD in philosophy in 1978 from the University of Wisconsin. She taught Philosophy at Carleton College from 1972 to 1993, beginning as an instructor and leaving as a full professor. She joined Binghamton University in 1993, where she was Professor of Comparative Literature and Women's Studies. During her time there, she taught in the Philosophy, Interpretation, and Culture program, the Latin American and Caribbean Area Studies Program, the Women, Gender, and Sexuality Studies Program, and the Department of Comparative Literature. She also held visiting appointments at ACM Chicago, Instituto Tilcara de la Universidad de Buenos Aires, Universidad Andina Simón Bolivar, and elsewhere. Her scholarship ranged across disciplines, extending from social and political philosophy to decolonial feminism, Andean philosophy, Latino politics and theories of resistance.

Lugones's work has been influenced by Gloria Anzaldúa, Combahee River Collective, Audre Lorde, Marilyn Frye, Kimberlé Crenshaw, Frantz Fanon, and Aníbal Quijano.

Outside of the academy, Lugones also worked as a popular educator. Inspired by the Highlander Folk School, in 1990 she co-founded La Escuela Popular Norteña in Valdez, New Mexico.

== Research ==
=== Plurality ===
Lugones is the author of Pilgrimages/Peregrinajes: Theorizing Coalition Against Multiple Oppressions (2003) a seminal, highly praised collection of essays, many of which were originally published in Hypatia, Signs, and other journals. Among the essays included are "Playfulness, ‘World’‐Travelling, and Loving Perception", which addresses the experience of navigating hyphenated identities from a phenomenological perspective. Lugones posits "a plurality of selves" that literally shift from being one person to being a different person, with each shift producing a corresponding new world. In another essay, "Purity, Impurity, and Separation", Lugones introduces the concept of curdling as an intersectional practice of resistance that works against an oppressive logic of purity. Examples of curdling include: code-switching, drag, gender transgression and multilingual experimentation.

=== World travelling ===
Lugones wrote an article called Playfulness, "World"-Travelling, and Loving Perception that uses her own method which she called "World Travelling" to understand how other individuals perceive us and themselves in their own world. Allowing us to travel to different worlds and comprehending others will permit us to start to love them through their own experience. By identifying with them people will began to understand who they are as an individual. Lugones explained the arrogant gaze is a technique many individuals have used to break their spirit to conquer their worlds; however, Lugones argues that loving perception is the response to the arrogant gaze that has us travel to other worlds.

Lugones informed us that we can be at ease in different worlds by being able to speak the language of the world we enter, subjectively happy in a world where you are free to decide anything for yourself without any restriction, personal relation with people to create a bond, and sharing with one another an interest with a stranger that allows to relate with one another. However, having the sense of ease in a different world is not enough to understand an individual because you need more than easiness to love and identify with others. Lugones explained we need the attribute of playfulness to relate with others since it allows us to exist with an openness to accepting and creating new ideas without any rules or barriers to hinder us. Accordingly, the "loving perception" and the playfulness co-exist to love and understand one another who are different.

=== Coloniality of gender ===
In her later work, "Heterosexualism and the Colonial/Modern Gender System" (2007) and "Toward a Decolonial Feminism" (2010), Lugones turns her attention to coloniality: its impact on gender formation, as well as various strategies of resistance which could contribute toward its eventual dismantling. Combining Anibal Quijano's theory of the coloniality of power with a feminist, intersectionalist framework, Lugones concludes that gender is a colonial imposition. Drawing on historical examples of pre-colonial, gynecratic Native American tribes, Lugones situates gender as a colonial classification system that divides and subjugates people differently depending on multiple intersectional factors including class and ethnicity.

== Recognition and awards ==
In 2016, she was named Distinguished Woman Philosopher by the Society for Women in Philosophy. In 2020, she was awarded the Frantz Fanon Lifetime Achievement Award from the Caribbean Philosophical Association in recognition of her contribution to decolonial philosophy/theory, feminist philosophy/theory, Indigenous philosophy/theory, critical gender, race and sexuality studies, Latin American philosophy and world systems theory.

== Illness and death ==
Lugones was diagnosed with her third occurrence of lung cancer in late 2019 and hospitalized with pneumonia-like symptoms after undergoing radiation treatment in 2020. On 14 July 2020, at 76 years of age, Lugones died at a hospital in Syracuse, New York. The cause was cardiac arrest.

== Bibliography ==
=== Books ===
- Lugones, María (2003). Pilgrimages/Peregrinajes: Theorizing Coalition Against Multiple Oppressions. Lanham, Md.: Rowman & Littlefield. ISBN 978-1-4616-4090-5. OCLC 606972544.
- Kusch, Rodolfo; Lugones, María; Price, Joshua M.; Mignolo, Walter (2010). Indigenous and popular thinking in América. Durham, NC: Duke University Press. ISBN 978-0-8223-9251-4. OCLC 631245966.

=== Papers ===
- Lugones, María (1995). "Hard to Handle Anger". In Bell, Linda A.; Blumenfeld, David (eds.). Overcoming Racism and Sexism. Lanham, MD: Rowman & Littlefield. ISBN 0-8476-8030-4. OCLC 32235851.
- Lugones, María (1998). "The Discontinuous Passing of the Cachapera/Tortillera from the Barrio to the Bar to the Movement". In Bar On, Bat-Ami; Ferguson, Ann (eds.). Daring to Be Good: Essays in Feminist Ethico-Politics. New York: Routledge. ISBN 0-415-91554-6. OCLC 37261096.
- Lugones, María (2022-02-08) [First published 1998]. "Motion, Stasis, and Resistance to Interlocked Oppressions". In Aiken, Susan Hardy; et al. (eds.). Making Worlds: Gender, Metaphor, Materiality. University of Arizona Press. doi:10.2307/j.ctv27bds8b.8.
- Lugones, María (2017-09-05) [First published 1998]. "Enticements and Dangers of Community for a Radical Politics". In Young, Iris Marion; Jaggar, Alison M. (eds.). A Companion to Feminist Philosophy. Oxford, UK: Blackwell Publishing Ltd. doi:10.1002/9781405164498.ch47.
- Lugones, María (1999). "Tenuous connections in impure communities". Ethics and the Environment. 4 (1). Elsevier BV: 85–90. Bibcode:1999EEnv....4...85L. doi:10.1016/s1085-6633(99)80009-6. ISSN 1085-6633. S2CID 143709821.
- Beltré, Mildred; Bryce, Geoff; Camacho, Julia Schiavone; Flores, Aurelia; Gonzales, Easa; Hernandez, Nydia; Hoagland, Sarah; Keating, Cricket; Kerr, Laura DuMond; Lugones, María; Mutis, Rafael; Price, Josh; Restrepo, Rocio; Santos, Rick; Silverio, Rocio (1999). "Towards a practice of radical engagement: Escuela Popular Norteña's 'Politicizing the Everyday' Workshop". The Radical Teacher (56): 13–18. ISSN 0191-4847. JSTOR 20710014.
- Lugones, Maria (2000). "Multiculturalism and Publicity: On María Pía Lara's Moral Structures". Hypatia. 15 (3). Cambridge University Press: 175–181. doi:10.1111/j.1527-2001.2000.tb00337.x. ISSN 0887-5367. S2CID 143529804.
- Lugones, María (2000). "Wicked Caló: A Matter of the Authority of Improper Words". In Hoagland, Sarah Lucia; Frye, Marilyn (eds.). Feminist Interpretations of Mary Daly. University Park, Pa.: The Pennsylvania State University Press. ISBN 0-271-02018-0. OCLC 42954756.
- Lugones, María (2004). "Impure Communities". Diversity and Community: An Interdisciplinary Reader. Malden, MA, UK: Blackwell Publishers Ltd. pp. 58–64. doi:10.1002/9780470756102.ch4. ISBN 9780470756102.
- Price, Joshua M; Lugones, María (2003). "Problems of Translation in Postcolonial Thinking". Anthropology News. 44 (4). Wiley: 7–9. doi:10.1111/an.2003.44.4.7. ISSN 1541-6151.
- Lugones, María; Price, Joshua (2003). "The Inseparability of Race, Class, and Gender in Latino Studies". Latino Studies. 1 (2). Springer Science and Business Media LLC: 329–332. doi:10.1057/palgrave.lst.8600039. ISSN 1476-3435. S2CID 143652243.
- Lugones, María (2007). "Heterosexualism and the Colonial/Modern Gender System". Hypatia. 22 (1). Cambridge University Press: 186–219. doi:10.1111/j.1527-2001.2007.tb01156.x. ISSN 0887-5367. S2CID 143600656.
- Lugones, María (2008-12-30). "Colonialidad y género". Tabula Rasa (9). Colegio Mayor de Cundinamarca: 73–101. doi:10.25058/20112742.340. hdl:10596/7870. ISSN 1794-2489.
- Lugones, María (2010-10-01). "Toward a Decolonial Feminism". Hypatia. 25 (4): 742–759. doi:10.1111/j.1527-2001.2010.01137.x. ISSN 0887-5367. JSTOR 40928654. S2CID 143897451.
- Lugones, María (2011). "Comment: It's All in Having a History: A Response to Michael Hames-García's Queer Theory Revisited". Gay Latino Studies: A Critical Reader. Duke University Press. doi:10.1215/9780822393856-003.
- Lugones, María (2020-01-01). "Gender and Universality in Colonial Methodology". Critical Philosophy of Race. 8 (1–2). The Pennsylvania State University Press: 25–47. doi:10.5325/critphilrace.8.1-2.0025. ISSN 2165-8684. S2CID 214438768.
