= Tidiane N'Diaye =

Franco-Senegalese economist (1950–2025)

Tidiane N'Diaye (20 August 1950 – 26 October 2025) was a Franco-Senegalese anthropologist, economist, and writer.

He was the author of a number of publications on the history of Black Africa and the African diaspora, as well as numerous economic studies of the Institut national de la statistique et des études économiques on the French overseas departments (Guadeloupe, French Guiana, Martinique).

N'Diaye's essays on the Arab slave trade (Le génocide voilé "the veiled genocide", Étude de la traite négrière arabo-musulmane "study of the Arab-Muslim negro slave trade") were nominated for the Prix Renaudot in 2008.

N'Diaye died in Toubab Dialaw, Senegal, on 26 October 2025, at the age of 75.

== Bibliography ==
=== Black history ===
- Mémoire d'errance, A3, Paris, 1998, 206 p. (ISBN 2-84436-000-9)
- La longue marche des peuples noirs, Publibook, coll. « Littérature africaine », 2000, 293 p. (ISBN 978-2-7483-0021-5)
- L'Empire de Chaka Zoulou, L'Harmattan, coll. « Études africaines », 2002, 218 p. (ISBN 2-7475-1920-1)
- Les Falachas, Nègres errants du peuple juif, Gallimard, coll. « Continents noirs », 2004 (ISBN 978-2070771356), nommé Prix Fetkann de la Recherche 2005.
- L'Éclipse des Dieux, Éditions du Rocher/Serpent A Plumes, 2006, 317 p. (ISBN 978-2-268-05641-8)
- Le génocide voilé, Gallimard, coll. « Continents noirs », 2008, 253 p. (ISBN 978-2070119585)

=== Economy ===
- Départements Français d'Outre Mer : Approche économique et statistique, BN-INSEE N°19, Observatoire économique de Paris, juillet 1994.
- Marché de l'emploi : Mesures et outils statistiques, BN-INSEE N° 20, Observatoire économique de Paris, septembre 1994.
- Tissu des PME-DOM, modélisation et perspectives, BN-INSEE N° 21, Observatoire économique de Paris, janvier 1995.
- L'entrepise moteur de l'économie guadeloupéenne, BN-INSEE N° 46, Observatoire économique de Paris, octobre. 1996.
- Guadeloupe : projection démographique Horizon 2030, Études - Conjoncture, Cahiers INSEE - Antilles - Guyane 2000.
- Tableaux économiques régionaux Antilles-Guyane, Chap. « Entreprises, sociétés, démographie », TER 2005/2006

=== Poetry ===
- Passions créoles, Publibook, 2001, 50 p. (ISBN 2-84436-000-9)
