= Tupac Enrique Acosta =

Native American activist (1952–2023)

- Born: February 7, 1952; San Antonio, Texas, U.S.
- Died: November 9, 2023 (aged 71)
- Occupation: Activist

Tupac Enrique Acosta (February 7, 1952 – November 9, 2023) was an Indigenous activist.

== Early life ==
Born in San Antonio, Texas, Tupac Enrique Acosta identified as Izkaloteka, descendants of the Mexica Indigenous people of modern-day Mexico and the Southwestern U.S. Tupac Enrique Acosta, originally referred to as Enrique Acosta, switched names in representation of Incan leader, Túpac Amaru. Acosta was also known as Tupac Huehuecoyotl after Huehuecoyotl, a Nahuatl word meaning ancient coyote.

== Career ==
Acosta was involved in the Chicano Movement in the early seventies. His guidance was critical in the formation of the Nahui Ollin educational framework implemented in the former K-12 Mexican American Studies Department Programs in Tucson Unified School District and in its evolution, the Xicanx Institute for Teaching & Organizing.

The Maricopa County Organizing Project(MCOP) was founded in 1977 for farmworkers and undocumented workers to protect human rights and represent the workforce. The organization was involved in strikes of both documented and undocumented workers in the Phoenix area. Acosta was involved in this organization, however was not one of the board members or directors. By 1993, MCOP no longer existed and developed into Tonatierra Community Development Institute, with more focus on advocacy for Indigenous people. Tupac Enrique Acosta co-founded and led this institute. It continued to be a significant part of his life until his death in Phoenix, Arizona. In 2004 Acosta and the organization Tonatierra helped organize and lead several events over the week to celebrate Indigenous People's Day on March 11.

Acosta was heavily involved in global efforts to discuss indigenous rights and the pervasive effects of colonialism on communities. He spent decades travelling to various Continental Indigenous Summits and was well known among Indigenous activists for his work in the US and beyond. In 1990 he went to Quito, Ecuador to participate in the First Continental Encounter of Indigenous Nations, Pueblos and Organizations.

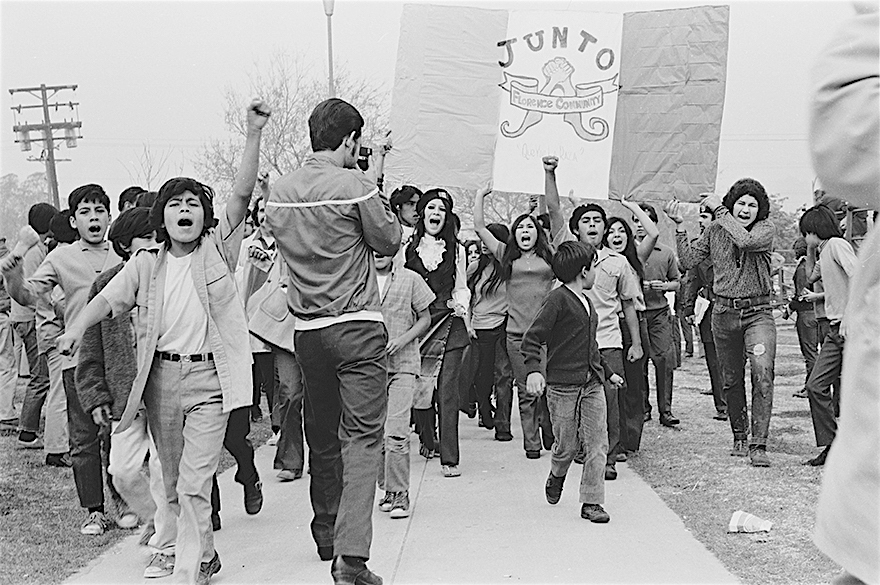
On January 31, 1971, La Marcha Por La Justicia located at Belvedere park was a protest as part of the Chicano Movement, a movement which Acosta participated in. The marchers pictured are from Florencia barrio of South Central Los Angeles.

In 2009, Acosta led a two day long ceremonial run with elders, and Raza participants from Tucson to Phoenix. This run was in opposition of Senate Bill 1069, that wished to ban Raza and ethnic studies for grade school students in Arizona. In 2010 Acosta participated in protests in Arizona against the anti-immigration Senate Bill 1070.

He was a supporter of free, prior, and informed consent for communities. Free, prior, and informed consent (FPIC) is a principle that is still being solidified in law internationally. The UN Workshop on Indigenous Peoples, Private Sector Natural Resource, Energy and Mining Companies and Human Rights held in 2001 recognized the lack of universal agreement about FPIC and the need to establish human rights standards. Acosta submitted a statement on behalf of Tonatierra discussing this in February 2023, while the UNOHCHR was discussing the impact of new climate protection technologies. Acosta also spent time as a guest on many podcasts and travelled internationally to promote discourse on the Doctrine of Discovery and promote Indigenous culture and advocacy.

== Death and memorial ==
Tupac Enrique Acosta died due to cancer at the age of 71 in November 2023. A memorial was held by Acosta's family at the Salt River Memorial Hall with hundreds of people attending. Special permission had to be granted by the Salt River Pima-Maricopa Indian Tribe for the ceremony to be held there as typically the hall is only accessible to tribe members. The Huhugam Heritage Center is usually only open to members of the Akimel O’otham and the Piipaash tribes but Shannon Rivers and other intermediaries for the Center stated that Acosta was "A warrior for our people. Not just for the O'odham people, but for all indigenous peoples," which is why they allowed an open service. He was also honored at the 2024 UN Permanent Forum on Indigenous Issues in New York for dedicating his life to advocating for the environment and working with Indigenous Nations.
