= Pensamiento Serpentino =

Poem by Luis Valdez

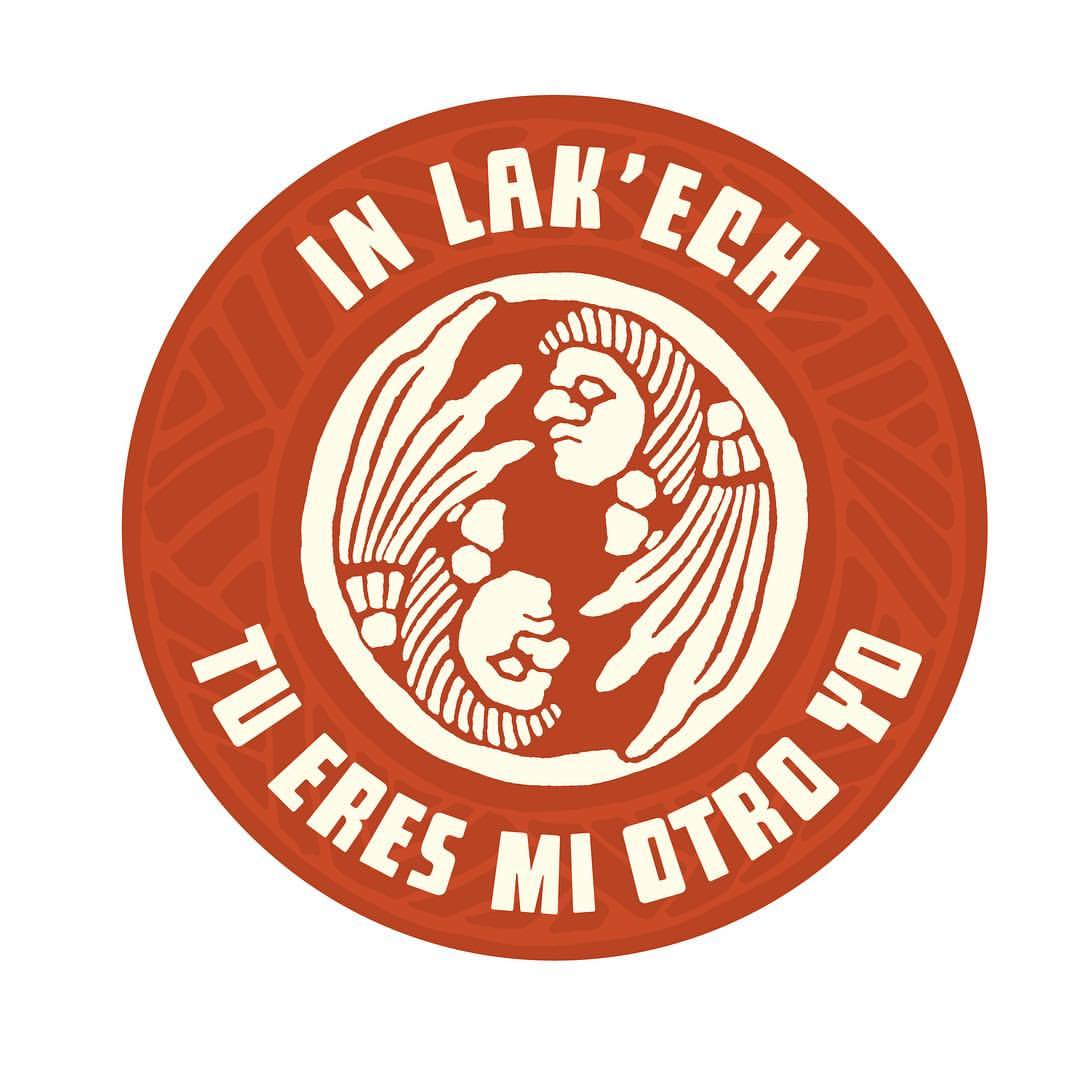
The Mayan concept of In Lak'ech is a theme of Luis Valdez's poem.

Pensamiento Serpentino (Serpentine Thought) is a poem by Chicano playwright Luis Valdez originally published by Cucaracha Publications, which was part of El Teatro Campesino, in 1973. The poem famously draws on philosophical concepts held by the Mayan people known as In Lak'ech, meaning "you are the other me." The poem also draws, although less prominently, on Aztec traditions, such as through the appearance of Quetzalcoatl. The poem received national attention after it was illegally banned as part of the removal of Mexican American Studies Programs in Tucson Unified School District. The ban was later ruled unconstitutional.

The verses are "frequently recited daily in high school," but ethnic studies teachers say it is not a prayer, but an "affirmation."

== Themes ==
Scholar Sheila Marie Contreras states that the poem "brings together Christian and Mesoamerican religious symbolism" and that it serves as a model for liberation and education which challenges dominant cultural conventions. Valdez drew on Mesoamerican themes through the work of Mayan scholar Domingo Martinez Paredez. As scholar Yolanda Broyles-Gonzalez states, Valdez incorporates "Indigenous knowledge" in his work, replacing Judeo-Christian belief instead with a call to "return to Indigenous spirituality to revitalize ancient cultural practices that could enable Chicanas/os to resist more successfully the debilitating effects of Anglo-American hegemony." For Valdez, Indigenous ways of knowing are thus essential to Chicano/a spiritual liberation.

The poem cites Quetzalcoatl's "cyclical shedding of skin as a dominant motif to represent the rebirth and renewal of spiritual and material forces. The undulating movement of the snake connotes the eternal presence of circulation and energy throughout the physical world, including humanity." Valdez evokes in the poem that revolutionary change is possible through Indigenous teachings, in which Chicana/os are able to re-identify with the "Cosmic Center" of Mayan spirituality. This would, in Valdez's view, provide a way for the Chicana/o people to "throw off the ideological yokes of European Catholicism and reclaim the Indigenous gods and goddesses displaced by Judeo-Christian monotheism."

Another theme of the poem is its criticism of the United States and its involvement in spreading war and terror throughout the world. Particularly the poem criticizes the U.S. involvement in the Vietnam War and the ways in which it has "waged violence on communities at home and abroad."

== Ban of In Lak'ech ==
The poem was used in the Mexican American Studies Programs (MAS) in Tucson School District. The MAS programs were founded from grassroots movements in 1998 which sought to help Chicano students, who were largely being ignored. On average, the classes were about 90% Chicano/a and Latino/a and proved to help students graduate, pursue higher education, and score higher test scores. A study found that "while 48 percent of Latino students were dropping out of high school, 100 percent of those students enrolled in Mexican-American studies classes at Tucson High were graduating, and 85 percent were going on to college."

In 2010, the programs were effectively banned and former Arizona Superintendent of Public Instruction, John Huppenthal cited that reading the poem in classes of the Mexican American Studies Department was illegal and in violation of the state's ethnic studies law. Prior to the banning of the MAS programs, classes had opened with students reading of the following section of the poem so that they could understand concepts in the poem:

In Lak'ech

Tú eres mi otro yo. / You are my other me.

Si te hago daño a ti, / If I do harm to you,

Me hago daño a mi mismo. / I do harm to myself.

Si te amo y respeto, / If I love and respect you,

Me amo y respeto yo. / I love and respect myself.

A study by the American Educational Research Journal demonstrated that students who were in the classes of the MAS programs "performed better on state tests and graduated at higher rates." In 2017, it was determined that the Tucson Unified School District had violated the rights of the students. The court also found that the ban was motivated by racism.
