= Nelson Maldonado-Torres =

Puerto Rican decolonial philosopher

Nelson Maldonado-Torres (born 1971 in San Juan, Puerto Rico) is a Puerto Rican philosopher and professor in Philosophy at University of Connecticut-Storrs. He received his PhD from Brown University in Religious Studies. His work has been influential in contributing to ideas about decoloniality decolonizing epistemology, and in critiquing Western liberalism and Eurocentrism. He is influenced by the works of Frantz Fanon, Emmanuel Levinas, and Enrique Dussel.

He critiques the notion of representational politics as being enough to contribute to systemic change. His work has been described as "animated by an ethic of decolonial love." He is also noted for contributing to discourse on the decolonial turn.

== Career ==
He was the head of the Caribbean Philosophical Association from 2008 to 2013. He was one of the signatories to support the creation for a Latina/o Academy of Arts and Sciences in the United States.

== Publications ==
=== Books ===
- Against War: Views from the Underside of Modernity (2008)
- La descolonización y el giro de(s)colonial (2012)

=== Select articles ===
- Maldonado-Torres, N. (2007). On the coloniality of being: Contributions to the development of a concept. Cultural studies, 21(2-3), 240-270
- Maldonado-Torres, N. (2011). Thinking through the decolonial turn: Post-continental interventions in theory, philosophy, and critique—An introduction. Transmodernity: Journal of peripheral cultural production of the Luso-Hispanic world, 1(2).
- Maldonado-Torres, N. (2016). "Outline of ten theses on coloniality and decoloniality".
