= Decolonization of knowledge =

Process of undoing colonial influences on knowledge

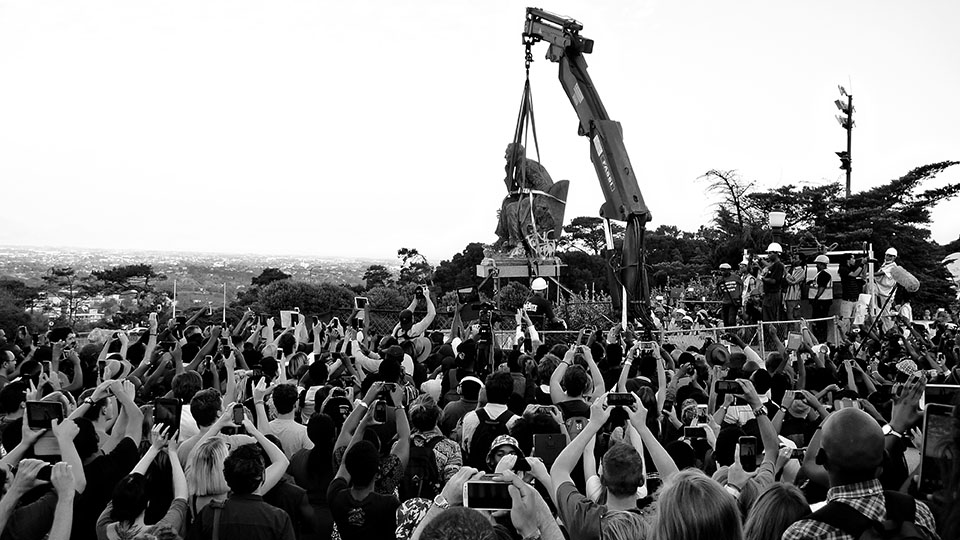
Removal of the statue of Cecil Rhodes from the campus of the University of Cape Town on 9 April 2015. Rhodes Must Fall movement is said to have been motivated by a desire to decolonize knowledge and education in South Africa.

Decolonization of knowledge (also epistemic decolonization or epistemological decolonization) is a concept advanced in decolonial scholarship (Note: Citing Nelson Maldonado Torres, Sabelo J. Ndlovu-Gatsheni states that "Decoloniality announces the broad 'decolonial turn' that involves the 'task of the very decolonization of knowledge, power and being, including institutions such as the university'") (Note: Zavala, for example, comments that the decolonial project is also "a project for epistemological diversity" that "re-envisions and develops knowledges and knowledge systems (epistemologies) that have been silenced and colonized." He says it is an attempt "to recover repressed and latent knowledges while at the same time generating new ways of seeing and being in the world.") that critiques the perceived hegemony of Western knowledge systems. (Note: On the usage of the term "Western knowledge system", Jaco S. Dreyer writes: "I use the notion of 'Western knowledge system' to refer to the institutionalisation and development of scientific knowledge in Europe, and later in other 'First World' contexts, as part of Western modernity, and its continuation in present-day scholarship. I am aware that this is a gross simplification of hundreds of years of development of science in the Western world. This formulation also glosses over the great variety of epistemological, ontological, methodological and axiological constellations within this knowledge system.") It seeks to construct and legitimize other knowledge systems by exploring alternative epistemologies, ontologies and methodologies. It is also an intellectual project that aims to "disinfect" academic activities that are believed to have little connection with the objective pursuit of knowledge and truth. The presumption is that if curricula, theories, and knowledge are colonized, it means they have been partly influenced by political, economic, social and cultural considerations. The decolonial knowledge perspective covers a wide variety of subjects including philosophy (epistemology in particular), science, history of science, and other fundamental categories in social science.

== Background ==
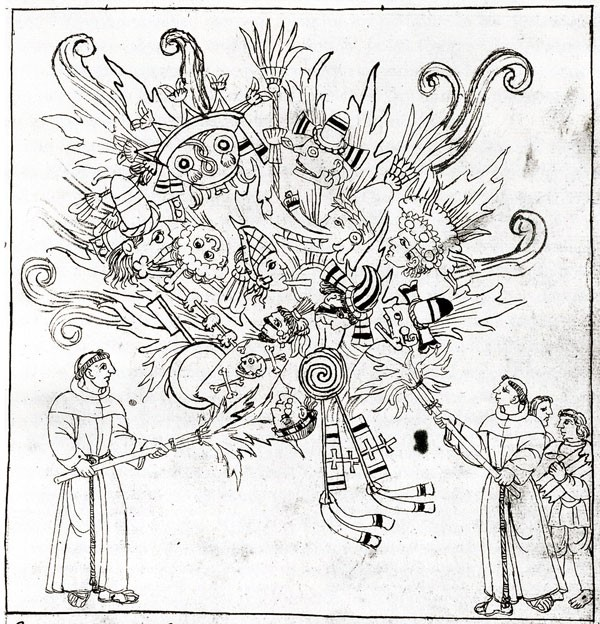
In his 1585 Descripción de Tlaxcala, Diego Muñoz Camargo illustrates the destruction of Mexican codices by Franciscan friars.

Decolonization of knowledge inquires into the historical mechanisms of knowledge production and their perceived colonial and ethnocentric foundations. Budd L. Hall et al argue that knowledge and the standards that determine the validity of knowledge have been disproportionately informed by Western system of thought and ways of being in the world. According to Jaco S. Dreyer, the western knowledge system that emerged in Europe during renaissance and Enlightenment was deployed to legitimise Europe's colonial endeavour, which eventually became a part of colonial rule and forms of civilization that the colonizers carried with them. This perspective maintains that the knowledge produced by the Western system was deemed superior to that produced by other systems since it had a universal quality. Decolonial scholars concur that the western system of knowledge still continues to determine as to what should be considered as scientific knowledge and continues to "exclude, marginalise and dehumanise" those with different systems of knowledge, expertise and worldviews. Anibal Quijano stated:

In effect, all of the experiences, histories, resources, and cultural products ended up in one global cultural order revolving around European or Western hegemony. Europe's hegemony over the new model of global power concentrated all forms of the control of subjectivity, culture, and especially knowledge and the production of knowledge under its hegemony... They repressed as much as possible the colonized forms of knowledge production, the models of the production of meaning, their symbolic universe, the model of expression and of objectification and subjectivity.

In her book Decolonizing Methodologies: Research and Indigenous Peoples, Linda Tuhiwai Smith writes:

Imperialism and colonialism brought complete disorder to colonized peoples, disconnecting them from their histories, their landscapes, their languages, their social relations and their own ways of thinking, feeling and interacting with the world.

According to this viewpoint, colonialism has ended in the legal and political sense, but its legacy continues in many "colonial situations" where individuals and groups in historically colonized places are marginalized and exploited. Decolonial scholars refer to this continuing legacy of colonialism as "coloniality", which describes the oppression and exploitation left behind by colonialism in a variety of interrelated domains, including the domain of subjectivity and knowledge.

== Origin and development ==
In community groups and social movements in the Americas, decolonization of knowledge traces its roots back to resistance against colonialism from its very beginning in 1492. Its emergence as an academic concern is a rather recent phenomenon. According to Enrique Dussel, the theme of epistemological decolonization has originated from a group of Latin American thinkers. Although the notion of decolonization of knowledge has been an academic topic since the 1970s, Walter Mignolo says it was the ingenious work of Peruvian sociologist Anibal Quijano that "explicitly linked coloniality of power in the political and economic spheres with the coloniality of knowledge." It has developed as "an elaboration of a problematic" that began as a result of several critical stances such as postcolonialism, subaltern studies and postmodernism. Enrique Dussel says epistemological decolonization is structured around the notions of coloniality of power and transmodernity, which traces its roots in the thoughts of José Carlos Mariátegui, Frantz Fanon and Immanuel Wallerstein. According to Sabelo J. Ndlovu-Gatsheni, although the political, economic, cultural and epistemological dimensions of decolonization were and are intricately connected to each other, attainment of political sovereignty was preferred as a "practical strategic logic of struggles against colonialism." As a result, political decolonization in the twentieth century failed to attain epistemological decolonization, as it did not widely inquire into the complex domain of knowledge.

== Themes ==
According to Alex Broadbent, decolonization is sometimes understood as a rejection of the notion of objectivity, which is seen as a legacy of colonial thought. He argues that universal conception of ideas such as "truth" and "fact" are Western constructs that are imposed on other foreign cultures. This tradition considers notions of truth and fact as "local", arguing that what is "discovered" or "expressed" in one place or time may not be applicable in another. The concerns of decolonization of knowledge are that the western knowledge system has become a norm for global knowledge and that its methodologies are the only ones deemed appropriate for use in knowledge production. This perceived hegemonic approach towards other knowledge systems is said to have reduced epistemic diversity and established the center of knowledge, eventually suppressing all other knowledge forms. Boaventura de Sousa Santos says "throughout the world, not only are there very diverse forms of knowledge of matter, society, life and spirit, but also many and very diverse concepts of what counts as knowledge and criteria that may be used to validate it." However, it is claimed that this variety of knowledge systems has not gained much recognition. According to Lewis Gordon, the formulation of knowledge in its singular form itself was unknown to times before the emergence of European modernity. Modes of knowledge production and notions of knowledge were so diversified that knowledges, in his opinion, would be more appropriate description.

According to Walter Mignolo, the modern foundation of knowledge is thus territorial and imperial. This foundation is based on "the socio-historical organization and classification of the world founded on a macro narrative and on a specific concept and principles of knowledge" which finds its roots in European modernity. He articulates epistemic decolonization as an expansive movement that identifies "geo-political locations of theology, secular philosophy and scientific reason" while also affirming "the modes and principles of knowledge that have been denied by the rhetoric of Christianization, civilization, progress, development and market democracy." According to Achille Mbembe, decolonization of knowledge means contesting the hegemonic western epistemology that suppresses anything that is foreseen, conceived and formulated from outside of western epistemology. It has two aspects: a critique of Western knowledge paradigms and the development of new epistemic models. Savo Heleta states that decolonization of knowledge "implies the end of reliance on imposed knowledge, theories and interpretations, and theorizing based on one's own past and present experiences and interpretation of the world."

== Significance ==
According to Anibal Quijano, epistemological decolonization is necessary for opening up new avenues for intercultural communication and the sharing of experiences and meanings, laying the groundwork for an alternative rationality that could rightfully stake a claim to some degree of universality. Sabelo J. Ndlovu-Gatsheni says epistemological decolonization is essential for addressing the "asymmetrical global intellectual division of labor" in which Europe and North America not only act as teachers of the rest of the world but also serve as the centers for the production of theories and concepts that are ultimately "consumed" by the entire human race.

== Approaches ==
According to Linda Tuhiwai Smith, decolonization "does not mean a total rejection of all theory or research or Western knowledge". In Lewis Gordon's view, decolonization of knowledge mandates a detachment from the "commitments to notions of an epistemic enemy." It rather emphasizes "the appropriation of any and all sources of knowledge" in order to achieve relative epistemic autonomy and epistemic justice for "previously unacknowledged and/or suppressed knowledge traditions."

=== Indigenous decolonization ===
Indigenous decolonization describes ongoing theoretical and political processes whose goal is to contest and reframe narratives about indigenous community histories and the effects of colonial expansion, cultural assimilation, exploitative Western research, and often though not inherent, genocide. Indigenous people engaged in decolonization work adopt a critical stance towards western-centric research practices and discourse and seek to reposition knowledge within Indigenous cultural practices.

The decolonial work that relies on structures of western political thought has been characterized as paradoxically furthering cultural dispossession. In this context, there has been a call for the use of independent intellectual, spiritual, social, and physical reclamation and rejuvenation even if these practices do not translate readily into political recognition. Scholars may also characterize indigenous decolonization as an intersectional struggle that "cannot liberate all people without first addressing racism and sexism."

Beyond the theoretical dimensions of indigenous-decolonization work, direct action campaigns, healing journeys, and embodied social struggles for decolonization are frequently associated with ongoing native resistance struggles and disputes over land rights, ecological extraction, political marginalization, and sovereignty. While native resistance struggles have gone on for centuries, an upsurge of indigenous activism took place in the 1960s - coinciding with national liberation movements in Africa, Asia, and the Americas.

==== Relational model of knowledge ====
Decolonial scholars inquire into various forms of indigenous knowledges in their efforts to decolonize knowledge and worldviews. Louis Botha et al make the case for a "relational model of knowledge," which they situate within indigenous knowledges. These indigenous knowledges are based on indigenous peoples' perceptions and modes of knowing. They consider indigenous knowledges to be essentially relational because these knowledge traditions place a high value on the relationships between the actors, objects, and settings involved in the development of knowledge. Such "networked" relational approach to knowledge production fosters and encourages connections between the individuals, groups, resources, and other components of knowledge-producing communities. For Louis Botha et al, since it is built on an ontology that acknowledges the spiritual realm as real and essential to knowledge formation, this relationality is also fundamentally spiritual, and feeds axiological concepts about why and how knowledge should be created, preserved, and utilized.

=== In academia ===
Shose Kessi et al argue that the goal of academia is "not to reach new orders of homogeneity, but rather greater representation of pluralistic ideas and rigorous knowledge". They invite academics to carefully scrutinize the authors and voices that are presented as authorities on a subject or in the classroom, the methods and epistemologies that are taught or given preference, as well as the academic concerns that are seen as fundamental and the ones that are ignored. They must reconsider the pedagogical tools or approaches used in the learning process for students, as well as examine the indigenous or community knowledge systems that are followed, promoted, or allowed to redefine the learning agenda. The purpose and future of knowledge must also be reevaluated during this process. There have been suggestions for expanding the reading list and creating an inclusive curriculum that incorporates a range of voices and viewpoints in order to represent broader global and historical perspectives. Researchers are urged to investigate outside the Western canons of knowledge to determine whether there are any alternative canons that have been overlooked or disregarded as a result of colonialism.

Ngũgĩ wa Thiong'o, who emphasizes the significance of decolonizing history, memory, and language, has stated that language, not geopolitics, should serve as the initial point of decolonization. According to Mahmood Mamdani, the idea of a university based on a single language is a colonial heritage, as in the case of African universities, which began as a colonial project, with English or French being the project language, and it recognized only one intellectual tradition—the Western tradition. According to Mamdani, university education needs to be more diverse and multilingual, with a focus on not only providing Westernized education in a variety of languages but also on ways to advance non-Western intellectual traditions as living traditions that can support both scholarly and public discourse. Mamdani makes the case for allocating funds to the creation of academic units that may research and instruct in non-Western intellectual traditions. He believes that learning the language in which the tradition has been historically developed is necessary if one wants to access a different intellectual tradition.

=== In various disciplines ===
In order to overcome the perceived constraints of the Western canons of knowledge, proponents of knowledge decolonization call for the decolonization of various academic disciplines, including history, science and the history of science, philosophy, (in particular, epistemology), psychology, sociology, religious studies, legal studies, and ethnomusicology.

==== History ====
According to the official web page of the University of Exeter, the "colonialist worldview," which allegedly prioritises some people's beliefs, rights, and dignity over those of others, has had an impact on the theoretical framework that underpins the modern academic field of history. This modern field of study has first developed in Europe during a period of rising nationalism and colonial exploitation, which determines the historical narratives of the world. This account suggests "that the very ways we are conditioned to look at and think about the past are often derived from imperialist and racialised schools of thought". Decolonial approach in history requires "an examination of the non-western world on its own terms, including before the arrival of European explorers and imperialists". In an effort to understand the world before the fifteenth century, it attempts to situate Western Europe in relation to other historical "great powers" like the Eastern Roman Empire or the Abbasid Caliphate. It "requires rigorous critical study of empire, power and political contestation, alongside close reflection on constructed categories of social difference". According to Walter Mignolo, discovering the variety of local historical traditions are crucial for "restoring the dignity that the Western idea of universal history took away from millions of people".

==== Modern science ====
The decolonial approach contests the notion of science as "purely objective, solely empirical, immaculately rational, and thus, singularly truth confirming". According to this account, such an outlook towards science implies "that reality is discrete and stagnant; immune to its observer's subjectivity, including their cultural suasions; and dismountable into its component parts whose functioning can then be ascertained through verificationist means". Laila N Boisselle situates modern science within Western philosophy and Western paradigms of knowledge, saying that "different ways of knowing how the world works are fashioned from the cosmology of the observer, and provides opportunities for the development of many sciences". Margaret Blackie and Hanelie Adendorff argue "that the practice of science by scientists has been profoundly influenced by Western modernity". According to this perspective, modern science thus "reflects foundational elements of empiricism according to Francis Bacon, positivism as conceptualized by Comte, and neo-positivism as suggested by the School of Vienna in the early 1900s." Boisselle also suggests that the mainstream scientific perspective that downplays the function or influence of Spirit or God in any manifestation in its processes, is not only Western and modern but also secular in orientation.

Boisselle sought to identify two issues with Western knowledge, including "Western Modern Science". For her, it starts off by seeking to explain the nature of the universe on the basis of reason alone. The second is that it considers itself to be the custodian of all knowledge and to have the power "to authenticate and reject other knowledge." The idea that modern science is the only legitimate method of knowing has been referred to as "scientific fundamentalism" or "scientism". It assumes the role of a gatekeeper by situating "science for all" initiatives on a global scale inside the framework of scientism. As a result, it acquires the power to decide what scientific knowledge is deemed to be "epistemologically rigorous". According to Boaventura de Sousa Santos, in order to decolonize modern science, it is necessary to consider "the partiality of scientific knowledge", i.e. to acknowledge that, like any other system of knowledge, "science is a system of both knowledge and ignorance". For Santos, "scientific knowledge is partial because it does not know everything deemed important and it cannot possibly know everything deemed important". In this regard, Boisselle argues for a "relational science" based on a "relational ontology" that respects "the interconnectedness of physical, mental, emotional, and spiritual aspects of individuals with all living things and with the star world, and the universe".

Samuel Bendeck Sotillos, with reference to perennial philosophy, critiques modern science for its rejection of metaphysics and spiritual traditions from around the world. He states that "the belief that only the scientific method gives access to valid forms of knowledge is not only flawed but totalitarian, having its roots in the European Enlightenment or the so-called Age of Reason". For him, "This dogmatic outlook is not science, but an ideology known as scientism, which has nothing to do with the proper exercise of the scientific method". This viewpoint challenges the idea that science is Truth, with a capital "T", saying that "contemporary science is largely relegated to dealing with approximations; in doing so, it is always modifying its understanding and thus is in no position to declare what can be finally known with certainty", and it promotes an understanding of science within the confines of its underlying philosophical assumptions concerning physical reality. In this context, Sotillos seeks to revive traditional metaphysics, also known as sacred science or scientia sacra, which is guided by metaphysical principles and is based on the sapiential teachings of world religions.

==== History of science ====
Beginning in the middle of the 1980s, postcolonial histories of science is said to constitute a "decentered, diasporic, or 'global' rewriting of earlier nation-centred imperial grand narratives." These histories seek to uncover "counter-histories of science, the legacies of precolonial knowledge, or residues and resurrections of the constitutive relations of colonial science." Instead of "centering scientific institutes in colonial metropoles," this history attempts to examine what Warwick Anderson refers to "as the unstable economy of science's shifting spatialities as knowledge is transacted, translated, and transformed across the globe". It seeks to eradicate "imperial grand narratives", which is said to provincialize science into a single "indigenous knowledge tradition". Instead, it seeks to recognise "the culturally diverse and global origins of science", and build a cosmopolitan model of science history in place of the narrow view of science as the creation of "lone geniuses". This perspective acknowledges the contributions of other civilizations to science, and offers a "contrageography of science that is not Eurocentric and linear". The central tenet is that the history of science should be seen as a history of transmissions. In this, Prakash Kumar et al cite Joseph Needham as saying, "modern science...[is] like an ocean into which the rivers from all the world's civilizations have poured their waters".

==== Philosophy ====
Nelson Maldonado-Torres et al see the decolonial turn in philosophy "as a form of liberating and decolonising reason beyond the liberal and Enlightened emancipation of rationality, and beyond the more radical Euro-critiques that have failed to consistently challenge the legacies of Eurocentrism and white male heteronormativity (often Euro-centric critiques of Eurocentrism)". According to Sajjad H. Rizvi, the shift toward global philosophy may herald a radical departure from colonial epistemology and pave the way for the decolonization of knowledge, particularly in the study of the humanities. In opposition to what is said to have been the standard method in philosophy studies, he argues against focusing solely on Western philosophers. Rizvi makes the case for the inclusion of Islamic philosophy in the discussion because he thinks it will aid in the process of decolonization and may eventually replace the Eurocentric education of philosophy with an expansive "pedagogy of living and being". Philip Higgs argues for the inclusion of African philosophy in the context of decolonization. Similar suggestions have been made for Indian philosophy and Chinese philosophy. The decolonization of Russian philosophy has also been discussed in light of its ambiguous position between Western intellectual traditions and Russian imperialism. Maldonado-Torres et al discuss issues in the philosophy of race and gender as well as Asian philosophy and Latin American philosophy as instances of the decolonial turn and decolonizing philosophy, contending that "Asia and Latin America are not presented here as the continental others of Europe but as constructed categories and projects that themselves need to be decolonized".

==== Psychology ====
According to many influential colonial and postcolonial leaders and thinkers, decolonization was "essentially a psychological project" involving a "recovery of self" and "an attempt to reframe the damaging colonial discourses of selfhood". According to the decolonial perspective, Eurocentric psychology, which is based on a specific history and culture, places a strong emphasis on "experimental positivist methods, languages, symbols, and stories". A decolonizing approach in psychology thus seeks to show how colonialism, Orientalism, and Eurocentric presumptions are still deeply ingrained in modern psychological science as well as psychological theories of culture, identity, and human development. Decolonizing psychology entails comprehending and capturing the history of colonization as well as its perceived effects on families, nations, nationalism, institutions, and knowledge production. It seeks to extend the bounds of cultural horizons, which should serve as a gateway "to new confrontations and new knowledge". Decolonial turn in psychology entails upending the conventional research methodology by creating spaces for indigenous knowledge, oral histories, art, community knowledge, and lived experiences as legitimate forms of knowledge. Samuel Bendeck Sotillos seeks to break free from the alleged limits of modern psychology, which he claims is dominated by the precepts of modern science and which only addresses a very "restricted portion of human individuality". He instead wants to revive the traditional view of the human being as consisting of a spirit, a soul, and a body.

==== Sociology ====
Decolonial scholars argue that sociological study is now dominated by the viewpoints of academics in the Global North and empirical studies that are concentrated on these countries. This leads to sociological theories that portray the Global North as "normal" or "modern," while anything outside of it is assumed to be either "deviant" or "yet to be modernized." Such theories are said to undermine the concerns of the Global South despite the fact that they make up around 84% of the world population. They place a strong emphasis on taking into account the problems, perspectives, and way of life of those in the Global South who are typically left out of sociological research and theory-building; thus, decolonization in this sense refers to making non-Western social realities more relevant to academic debate.

==== Religious studies ====
According to the decolonial perspective, the study of religion is one of many humanities disciplines that has its roots in European colonialism. Because of this, the issues it covers, the concepts it reinforces, and even the settings in which it is taught at academic institutions all exhibit colonial characteristics. According to Malory Nye, in order to decolonize the study of religion, one must be methodologically cognizant of the historical and intellectual legacies of colonialism in the field, as well as fundamental presuppositions about the subject matter, including the conception of religion and world religions. For Adriaan van Klinken, a decolonial turn in the study of religions embraces reflexivity, is interactive, and challenges "the taken-for-granted Western frameworks of analysis and scholarly practice." It must accept "the pluriversality of ways of knowing and being" in the world. The interpretation of the Quran in the Euro-American academic community has been cited as one such example, where "the phenomenon of revelation (Wahy)" as it is understood in Islam is very often negated, disregarded, or regarded as unimportant to comprehending the scripture. According to Joseph Lumbard, Euro-American analytical modes have permeated Quranic studies and have a lasting impact on all facets of the discipline. He argues for more inclusive approaches that take into account different forms of analysis and make use of analytical tools from the classical Islamic tradition.

==== Legal studies ====
Aitor Jiménez González argues that the "generalized use of the term "law" or "Law" masks the fact that the concept we are using is not a universal category but a highly provincial one premised on the westernized legal cosmovision". According to him, it was not the "peaceful spread of a superior science" that ultimately led to the universal adoption of the western notion of law. Rather, it "was the result of centuries of colonialism, violent repression against other legal cosmovisions during the colonial periods and the persistence of the process referred to as coloniality". The decolonial stance on law facilitates dialogue between various understandings and epistemic perspectives on law in the first place, challenging the perceived hegemony of the westernized legal paradigm. It is a strategy for transforming a legal culture that historically was based on a hegemonic or Eurocentric understanding of the law into one that is more inclusive. It highlights the need for a fresh historical perspective that emphasizes diversity over homogeneity and casts doubt on the notion that the state is the "main organizer of legal and juridical life".

According to Asikia Karibi-Whyte, decolonization goes beyond inclusion in that it aims to dismantle the notions and viewpoints that undervalue the "other" in legal discourse. This point of view maintains that a society's values form the foundation of legal knowledge and argues for prioritizing those values when debating specific legal issues. This is because legal norms in former colonies bear the imprint of colonialism and values of colonial societies. For example, English Common Law predominates in former British colonies throughout Africa and Asia, whereas the Civil Law system is used in many former French colonies that mirrors the values of French society. In this context, decolonization of law calls "for the critical inclusion of epistemologies, ways of knowing, lived experiences, texts and scholarly works" that colonialism forced out of legal discourses.

==== Ethnomusicology ====
Decolonization in music has also reshaped the field of ethnomusicology, which long reflected colonial hierarchies in its study of non-Western music. Ghanaian musicologist Kofi Agawu argues that Western scholarship has “othered” African music by over-emphasizing rhythm and oral tradition, calling instead for equality between African and European systems of thought. Indigenous scholar Clint Bracknell advocates similar reforms, describing “Nyungarmusicology” as a model of research grounded in Indigenous self-representation and community collaboration. Later writers such as Deborah Wong and Kevin M. Delgado have linked decolonization to the politics of voice and institutional imagery, urging ethnomusicology to confront its own cultural assumptions. As a result of the strong push to decolonize, in 2013 the Society for Ethnomusicology removed the controversial "Little Man" logo from its journals cover.

=== Inclusive research ===
Neo-colonial research or neo-colonial science, frequently described as helicopter research, parachute science or research, parasitic research, or safari study, is when researchers from wealthier countries go to a developing country, collect information, travel back to their country, analyze the data and samples, and publish the results with little or no involvement of local researchers. A 2003 study by the Hungarian Academy of Sciences found that 70% of articles in a random sample of publications about least-developed countries did not include a local research co-author.

Frequently, during this kind of research, the local colleagues might be used to provide logistics support as fixers but are not engaged for their expertise or given credit for their participation in the research. Scientific publications resulting from parachute science frequently only contribute to the career of the scientists from rich countries, thus limiting the development of local science capacity (such as funded research centers) and the careers of local scientists. This form of "colonial" science has reverberations of 19th century scientific practices of treating non-Western participants as "others" in order to advance colonialism—and critics call for the end of these extractivist practices in order to decolonize knowledge.

This kind of research approach reduces the quality of research because international researchers may not ask the right questions or draw connections to local issues. The result of this approach is that local communities are unable to leverage the research to their own advantage. Ultimately, especially for fields dealing with global issues like conservation biology which rely on local communities to implement solutions, neo-colonial science prevents institutionalization of the findings in local communities in order to address issues being studied by scientists.

=== Shift in research methodology ===
According to Mpoe Johannah Keikelame and Leslie Swartz, "decolonising research methodology is an approach that is used to challenge the Eurocentric research methods that undermine the local knowledge and experiences of the marginalised population groups". Even though there is no set paradigm or practice for decolonizing research methodology, Thambinathan and Kinsella offer four methods that qualitative researchers might use. These four methods include engaging in transformative praxis, practicing critical reflexivity, employing reciprocity and respect for self-determination, as well as accepting "Other(ed)" ways of knowing. For Sabelo Ndlovu Gatsheni, decolonizing methodology involves "unmasking its role and purpose in research". It must transform the identity of research objects into questioners, critics, theorists, knowers, and communicators. In addition, research must be redirected to concentrate on what Europe has done to humanity and the environment rather than imitating Europe as a role model for the rest of the world.

=== Data decolonization ===
Data decolonization is the process of divesting from colonial, hegemonic models and epistemological frameworks that guide the collection, usage, and dissemination of data related to Indigenous peoples and nations, instead prioritising and centering Indigenous paradigms, frameworks, values, and data practices. Data decolonization is guided by the belief that data pertaining to Indigenous people should be owned and controlled by Indigenous people, a concept that is closely linked to data sovereignty, as well as the decolonization of knowledge.

Data decolonization is linked to the decolonization movement that emerged in the mid-20th century.

== Criticism ==
According to Piet Naudé, decolonization's efforts to create new epistemic models with distinct laws of validation than those developed in Western knowledge system have not yet produced the desired outcome. The present "scholarly decolonial turn" has been criticised on the ground that it is divorced from the daily struggles of people living in historically colonized places. Robtel Neajai Pailey says that 21st-century epistemic decolonization will fail unless it is connected to and welcoming of the ongoing liberation movements against inequality, racism, austerity, imperialism, autocracy, sexism, xenophobia, environmental damage, militarization, impunity, corruption, media surveillance, and land theft because epistemic decolonization "cannot happen in a political vacuum".

Olúfẹ́mi Táíwò argued that it is analytically unsound, conflating "coloniality" with "modernity", leading it to become an impossible political project. He further argued that it risks denying the formerly colonized countries agency, in not recognizing that people often consciously accept and adapt elements of different origins, including colonial ones. Jonatan Kurzwelly and Malin Wilckens used the example of decolonization of academic collections of human remains — originally used to further racist science and legitimize colonial oppression — to show how both contemporary scholarly methods and political practice perpetuate reified and essentialist notions of identities.

== See also ==
- Decolonization of higher education in South Africa
- Museum § Decolonization of museums
- Decolonising the Mind
- Decolonization of public space
- Space advocacy § Decolonizing space
- Universal Declaration of Human Rights
