= Coloniality of knowledge =

Decolonial theory

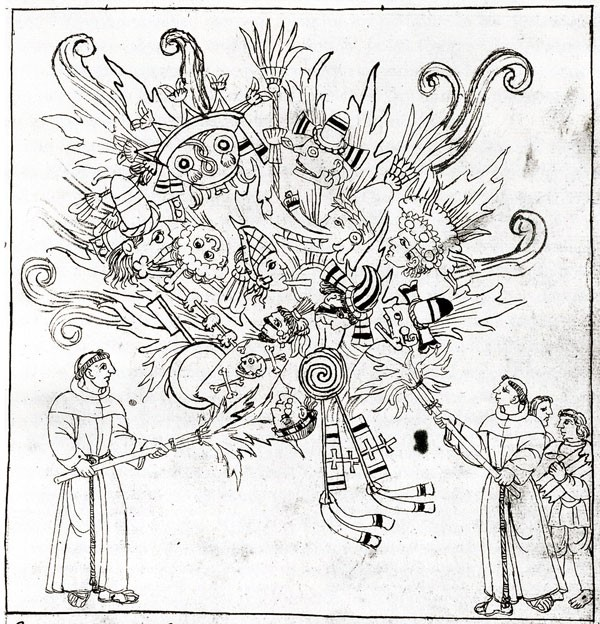
In his 1585 Descripción de Tlaxcala, Diego Muñoz Camargo illustrated the book burning of pre-Columbian codices by Franciscan friars.

Coloniality of knowledge was developed and adapted to contemporary decolonial thinking by the Peruvian sociologist Anibal Quijano. The concept critiques what proponents call the Eurocentric system of knowledge, arguing the legacy of colonialism survives within the domains of knowledge. For decolonial scholars, the coloniality of knowledge is central to the functioning of the coloniality of power and is responsible for turning colonial subjects into victims of the coloniality of being, a term that refers to the lived experiences of colonized peoples.

== Origin and development ==
Fregoso Bailón and De Lissovoy argue that Hatuey, a Taíno warrior from La Española (which contains Haiti and the Dominican Republic), was among the first to recognize "Western knowledge as a colonial discourse". Inspired by Hatuey, Antonio de Montesinos began his career as an educator in 1511, teaching Bartolomé de las Casas critical thinking.

In the contemporary era, Frantz Fanon is considered an influential figure for his critique of the intellectual aspects of colonialism. According to Fanon, "colonialism is a psychic and epistemological process as much as a material one." Quijano built on this insight, advancing the critique of colonialism's intellectual dimensions.

The concept of coloniality of knowledge comes from coloniality theories, (Note: Asabe W. Poloma; Katalin Szelényi: "The coloniality of knowledge, a concept derived from theories of coloniality, suggests that educational institutions represent the entanglement of coloniality, power, and the epistemic ego-politics of knowledge.") encompassing coloniality of power, coloniality of being, and coloniality of knowledge. (Note: Mamukwa, Lessem & Schieffer: "At the centre of coloniality are three important concepts: 'coloniality of power'; 'coloniality of knowledge'; and 'coloniality of being'." Steyn & Mpofu: "Coloniality stands on three pillars: coloniality of knowledge, coloniality of power and coloniality of being." Benyera et al: "Three elements make up global coloniality, namely the coloniality of power, coloniality of being and the coloniality of knowledge.") Peruvian sociologist Anibal Quijano introduced the concept of coloniality of knowledge in 1992, (Note: Paul Anthony Chambers: "The coloniality of knowledge thesis has some of its roots in a paper originally published in Spanish in 1992 by the Peruvian sociologist Aníbal Quijano, in which he coined the term 'coloniality of power'.") discussing global power systems, knowledge, racial hierarchy, and capitalism in Latin American history from the fourteenth century to the present. (Note: Karen Tucker: "As I have sought to understand the connections and disconnections amongst these different approaches to 'traditional knowledge', I have found it useful to think in terms of 'coloniality of knowledge'. The concept is most closely associated with Peruvian sociologist Aníbal Quijano, who developed it as part of a broader reflection on global structures of power, knowledge, racial hierarchization, and capitalism in the light of Latin American historical and cultural experiences from the fifteenth century to the present day.") Decolonial thinkers like Walter Mignolo, Enrique Dussel, and Santiago Castro-Gómez later expanded on the concept.

== Background ==
According to Quijano, colonialism has had a particular influence on colonized cultures' modes of knowing, knowledge production, perspectives, visions; and systems of images, symbols, and modes of signification; along with their resources, patterns, and instruments of formalized and objectivised expression. For Quijano, this suppression of knowledge accompanied the annihilation of indigenous populations throughout the continent, as well as indigenous societies and traditions. Quijano said the patterns of suppression, expropriation, and imposition of knowledge created during the colonial period, as refracted through conceptions of race and racial hierarchy, persisted after colonialism was overturned as "an explicit political order". This persists in numerous "colonial situations" in which individuals and groups in historically colonized regions are excluded and exploited. Decolonial scholars refer to this ongoing legacy of colonialism as "coloniality", which describes colonialism's perceived legacy of oppression and exploitation across many inter-related domains, including knowledge. Ndlovu-Gatsheni cites Quijano, referring to "control of economy; control of authority, control of gender and sexuality; and, control of subjectivity and knowledge".

== Coloniality logic ==
For Nelson Maldonado-Torres, coloniality denotes the long-standing power structures that developed as a result of colonialism but continue to have an impact on culture, labor, interpersonal relations, and knowledge production that extends far beyond the formal boundaries of colonial administrations. It lives on in literature, academic achievement standards, cultural trends, common sense, people's self-images, personal goals, and other aspects of modern life. Anibal Quijano described this power structure as "coloniality of power" that is predicated on the idea of "coloniality of knowledge", which is "central to the operation of the coloniality of power". While the term coloniality of power refers to the inter-relationship between "modern forms of exploitation and domination", the term coloniality of knowledge concerns the influence of colonialism on domains of knowledge production. Karen Tucker identifies the "coloniality of knowledge" as "one of multiple, intersecting forms of oppression" within a system of "global coloniality". Walter Mignolo argues that "the coloniality of knowledge [...] appropriates meaning just as the coloniality of power takes authority, appropriates land, and exploits labor".

The coloniality of knowledge raises epistemological concerns such as who creates what knowledge and for what purpose, the relevance and irrelevance of knowledge, and how specific knowledges disempower or empower certain peoples and communities. The thesis directly or implicitly questions fundamental epistemological categories and attitudes such as belief and the pursuit of objective truth, the concept of the rational subject, the epistemological distinction between the knowing subject and the known object, the assumption of "the universal validity of scientific knowledge, and the universality of human nature". According to this theory, these categories and attitudes are "Eurocentric constructions" that are intrinsically infused with what may be called the "colonial will to dominate". Decolonial theorists refer to "Eurocentric knowledge system", which they believe had assigned the creation of knowledge to Europeans and prioritized the use of European methods of knowledge production. According to Quijano, the hegemony of Europe over the new paradigm of global power consolidated all forms of control over subjectivity, culture and, in particular, knowledge and the creation of knowledge under its hegemony. This resulted in the denial of knowledge creation to conquered peoples on the one hand, and the repression of traditional forms of knowledge production on the other, based on the hierarchical structure's superiority/inferiority relationship.

Quijano characterizes Eurocentric knowledge as a "specific rationality or perspective of knowledge that was made globally hegemonic" through the intertwined operation of colonialism and capitalism. It works by constructing binary hierarchical relationships between "the categories of object" and symbolizes a specific secular, instrumental, and "technocratic rationality" that Quijano contextualizes in reference to the mid-seventeen century West European thought and the demands of nineteenth-century global capitalist expansion. For Quijano, it codifies relations between Western Europe and the rest of the world using categories such as "primitive-civilized", "irrational-rational", and "traditional-modern"; and creates distinctions and hierarchies between them so "non-Europe" is aligned with the past and is thus "inferior, if not always primitive". Similarly, it codifies the relationship between Western Europe and "non-Europe" as one between subject and object, perpetuating the myth that Western Europe is the only source of reliable knowledge. For Quijano, the "Western epistemological paradigm" suggests:

only European culture is rational, it can contain "subjects" – the rest are not rational, they cannot be or harbor "subjects". As a consequence, the other cultures are different in the sense that they are unequal, in fact inferior, by nature. They only can be "objects" of knowledge or/and of domination practices. From that perspective, the relation between European culture and the other cultures was established and has been maintained, as a relation between "subject" and "object". It blocked, therefore, every relation of communication, of interchange of knowledge and of modes of producing knowledge between the cultures, since the paradigm implies that between "subject" and "object" there can be but a relation of externality.

— Anibal Quijano quoted in Paul Anthony Chambers, Epistemology and Domination, 2020

The subject-object dualism proposed by Quijano and other decolonial thinkers such as Enrique Dussel is based on a particular reading of René Descartes' idea of cogito. The "I" in the iconic expression "I think, therefore I am" is an imperial "I" that, according to Quijano, "made it possible to omit every reference to any other 'subject' outside the European context".

Before Lyotard, Vattimo and Derrida in Europe, the Argentine Enrique Dussel signalled the consequences of Heidegger's critique of Western metaphysics and drew attention to the intrinsic relation between the modern subject of the Enlightenment and European colonial power. Behind the Cartesian ego cogito, which inaugurates modernity, there is a hidden logocentrism through which the enlightened subject divinizes itself and becomes a kind of demiurge capable of constituting and dominating the world of objects. The modern ego cogito thus becomes the will to power: "I think" is equivalent to "I conquer", the epistemic foundation upon which European domination has been based since the 16th century.

— Santiago Castro-Gómez quoted in Paul Anthony Chambers, Epistemology and Domination, 2020

According to the decolonial perspective, coloniality of knowledge thus refers to historically entrenched and racially driven intellectual practices that continuously elevate the forms of knowledge and "knowledge-generating principles" of colonizing civilizations while downgrading those of colonized societies. It stresses the role of knowledge in the "violences" that defined colonial rule, as well as the function of knowledge in sustaining the perceived racial hierarchization and oppression that were created over this time period.

=== Aspects ===
Sarah Lucia Hoagland identified four aspects of the coloniality of "Anglo-European knowledge practice":

1. The coloniality of knowledge entails Anglo-Eurocentric practices, in which "the only discourse for articulating Third World women's lives is a norming and normative Anglo-European one". For Hoagland, Western researchers evaluate their non-Western subjects through the lens of the Western conception of "woman". In so doing, Western feminists interpret their subjects through Western categories and ideals by interpolating them into Western semiotics and practices. Many Western feminist researchers, she said, perceive their subjects through cultural constructs that only see them as deficient to Western notions of womanhood and hence in desperate "need of enlightened rescue".
2. The research subject is analyzed solely through the perspective of rationality as defined by modern epistemology. Hoagland cites Anibal Quijano, who argues the coloniality of knowledge practices began with the Spanish colonization of the Americas in the fifteenth century, making it "unthinkable to accept the idea that a knowing subject was possible beyond the subject of knowledge postulated by the very concept of rationality" enshrined in modern epistemology.
3. Research methodologies assume "knowing (authorized) subjects" are the sole agents in research activities, and it is their "prerogative" to interpret and package information inside authorizing institutions. Consequently, "Western scientific practice" establishes the researcher "as a judge of credibility and a gatekeeper for its authority", which she identifies as "a discursive enactment of colonial relations". Such an approach is based on the assumption Western academics are disciplined to perceive "interpretation and packaging of information" as the domain of "the knowing subject", the researcher, rather than the "subject of knowing, the one being researched". Because only the researcher is thought to have the rightful agency to do so. According to Hoagland, the knowing subject must be examined with the same degree of care as the subjects of knowledge that the knowing subjects scrutinize.
  A conversation of "us" with "us" about "them" is a conversation in which "them" is silenced. "Them" always stands on the other side of the hill, naked and speechless, barely presence in its absence.
  — Trinh T. Minh-ha, Woman, Native, Other quoted in Sarah Lucia Hoagland, Aspects of the Coloniality of Knowledge, 2020
4. The coloniality of knowledge "presumes commensurability with Western discourse", and is the practice of "translating and rewriting other cultures, other knowledges, and other ways of being" into Western system of thought. Hoagland said reframing indigenous claims to make them understandable inside Western institutions amounts to rewriting to the point of eliminating indigenous culture. Because such a subject of knowing of research is not "approached as a knowing subject on her own terms" as "she falls short as a knowing subject on Western terms", she is not "rational" and does not function with and embrace individuality.

According to Nick Shepherd, the coloniality of knowledge has three dimensions; structural and logistical, epistemological, and ethical and moral. For Shepherd, data or information flowed in one direction and were essentially extractive in nature. Information, observations, and artifacts were transported from the global south and east to Europe and North America, where they were processed and published. Scholars in metropolitan institutions were eventually given precedence in the discipline's rank and hierarchy, while those in the global south were considered as "local enablers or collaborators on the ground". They were frequently referred to as "informants", "diggers", or simply "boys". Although this has been defined as a historical situation, Shepherd said this practice continues, and forms the structural and logistical aspects of the coloniality of knowledge.

In its epistemological dimension, Shepherd said coloniality of knowledge calls into question the commonly held categories and notions that characterize the intellectual process, as well as an understanding of what knowledge is and how it works. It entails comprehending how the conjoined settings of colonialism and modernity manifest themselves in the ways knowledge is conceptualized and formed in various disciplines. In its ethical and moral dimensions, coloniality of knowledge refers to the rights and entitlements that disciplinary practitioners acquire as part of their training, allowing them to interfere in locations and circumstances as a scientific right and as a moral act. Shepherd cites examples from archaeology, in which extractions were carried out in sacred places revered by the locals.

Similarly, Aram Ziai et al identified the "problem of coloniality" in three distinct but interconnected levels of knowledge production.

On the level of knowledge orders, we see it in epistemology (Whose experience and knowledge counts as valid, scientific knowledge? How is a theory of universally valid knowledge linked to the depreciation and destruction of other knowledge?) as well as in ontology (Which elements constitute our world and form the basis of our research and which are seen as irrelevant? Has this been influenced by the legitimation of domination? Do we perceive our units of analysis as individual and discrete or as always historically interwoven and entangled?). On the level of research methodology, we see it in the relations of power existing between subjects and objects of research (Who is seen as capable of producing knowledge? Who determines the purpose of research? Who provides the data for the research and who engages in theory building and career making on this basis?). On the level of the academia, we see it in the curricula (Which type of knowledge and which authors are being taught in the universities?) as well as in the recruitment of scholars (Which mechanisms of exclusion persist in the education system determining who will become a producer of knowledge in institutions of higher education?).

— Bendix, D.; Müller, F.; Ziai, A., Beyond the Master's Tools?: Decolonizing Knowledge Orders, Research Methods and Teaching, 2020

== Effects ==
According to William Mpofu, the coloniality of knowledge transforms colonial subjects into "victims of the coloniality of being", "a condition of inferiorisation, peripheralization, and dehumanization", which makes "primary reference to the lived experience of colonization and its impact on language". The coloniality of knowledge thesis asserts educational institutions reflect "the entanglement of coloniality, power, and the epistemic ego-politics of knowledge", which explains the "bias" that promotes Westernized knowledge production as impartial, objective, and universal while rejecting knowledge production influenced by "sociopolitical location, lived experience, and social relations" as "inferior and pseudo-scientific". Poloma et al said the worldwide domination of the Euro-American university model epitomizes coloniality of knowledge, which is reinforced through the canonization of Western curricula, the primacy of English language in instruction and research, and the fetishism of global rankings and Euro-American certification in third world countries.

Silova et al said the coloniality of knowledge production has unwittingly formed academic identities, both socializing "non-Western or not-so-Western" researchers into Western ways of thought and marginalizing them in knowledge creation processes, resulting in "academic mimetism" or "intellectual mimicry". The coloniality of knowledge has led to the formation of a knowledge barrier that prevents students and academics from generating new knowledge by adopting non-Western concepts. It also has a significant impact on the mainstream curriculum, which is founded on the same Western notions and paradigms, making it difficult for students to advance beyond the Western epistemological framework.

== Criticism ==
In a 2020 article, Paul Anthony Chambers said the theory of the coloniality of knowledge, which proposes a link between the legacy of colonialism and the production, validation, and transfer of knowledge, is "problematic" in some respects, particularly in its critique of Cartesian epistemology. An example of the latter is a 2012 chapter by Sarah Lucia Hoagland that cites Quijano and says that Cartesian methodology practices "the cognitive dismissal of all that lies outside of its bounds of sense ... resulting in a highly sophisticated Eurocentrism". For Hoagland, this tradition maintains "power relations by denying epistemic credibility to objects/subjects of knowledge who are marginalized, written subaltern, erased, criminalized ... and thereby denying relationality". (Chambers and Hoagland both cite Quijano but do not cite each other.)

While Chambers agreed with much of what the theory of the coloniality of knowledge asserts, he critiqued it for "fail[ing] to adequately demonstrate" how Cartesian/Western epistemology is tied to inequitable patterns of global knowledge production as well as larger forms of dominance and exploitation. Chambers recognized "the problematic political and sociological dimensions of knowledge production", which he said the decolonial thinkers also emphasized, but he objected to some of the underlying arguments of the thesis, which blamed Cartesian epistemology for "unjust structures of global knowledge production"; he argued that this thesis fails to explain how Cartesian epistemology has had the impact claimed by the decolonial thinkers.

Chambers said:

Quijano's claims are based on a questionable connection between the Cartesian epistemological categories of subject and object and the ideological and racist belief that Europeans were naturally superior to Indians and other colonized peoples who were deemed – although not by all Europeans, e.g. Las Casas – to be inferior because incapable of rational thought and hence more akin to children and therefore effectively non-autonomous "objects".

He also said: "While such a view is infamously to be found in Kant, there is no evidence of it in Descartes".

== Sources ==
- Beer, Andreas; Mackenthun, Gesa, eds. (2015). "Introduction". Fugitive Knowledge. The Loss and Preservation of Knowledge in Cultural Contact Zones (PDF). Waxmann Verlag GmbH. doi:10.31244/9783830982814. ISBN 978-3-8309-3281-9.
- Bendix, D.; Müller, F.; Ziai, A. (2020). Beyond the Master's Tools?: Decolonizing Knowledge Orders, Research Methods and Teaching. Kilombo: International Relations and Colonial Questions. Rowman & Littlefield Publishers. ISBN 978-1-78661-360-8.
- Benyera, E.; Sithole, T.; Jazbhay, A.H.; Tom, T.; Tomy, K.; Mazorodze, W.; Xaba, M.B.; Odok, G.E.; Pfukwa, C.; Mude, T. (2020). Breaking the Colonial "Contract": From Oppression to Autonomous Decolonial Futures. Lexington Books. ISBN 978-1-7936-2274-7.
- Chambers, Paul Anthony (2020). "Epistemology and Domination: Problems with the Coloniality of Knowledge Thesis in Latin American Decolonial Theory". Dados. 63 (4). FapUNIFESP (SciELO). doi:10.1590/dados.2020.63.4.221. ISSN 1678-4588. S2CID 229267050.
- Conway, J.M. (2013). Edges of Global Justice: The World Social Forum and Its "others". Online access with subscription: Proquest Ebook Central. Routledge. ISBN 978-0-415-50621-2.
- Dreyer, Jaco S. (2017). "Practical theology and the call for the decolonisation of higher education in South Africa: Reflections and proposals". HTS Theological Studies. 73 (4): 1–7. doi:10.4102/hts.v73i4.4805. ISSN 0259-9422.
- Fregoso Bailón, Raúl Olmo; De Lissovoy, Noah (2018). "Against coloniality: Toward an epistemically insurgent curriculum". Policy Futures in Education. 17 (3). SAGE Publications: 355–369. doi:10.1177/1478210318819206. ISSN 1478-2103. S2CID 150034890.
- Haynes, J. (2020). Peace, Politics, and Religion. MDPI AG. ISBN 978-3-03936-664-4.
- Hoagland, Sarah Lucia (2020). "Aspects of the Coloniality of Knowledge". Critical Philosophy of Race. 8 (1–2). The Pennsylvania State University Press: 48–60. doi:10.5325/critphilrace.8.1-2.0048. ISSN 2165-8684. S2CID 212859120.
- Hoagland, Sarah Lucia (2012). "Denying Relationality". In Sullivan, S.; Tuana, N. (eds.). Race and Epistemologies of Ignorance. SUNY series, Philosophy and Race. State University of New York Press. ISBN 978-0-7914-8003-8.
- Ibarra-Colado, Eduardo (2006). "Organization Studies and Epistemic Coloniality in Latin America: Thinking Otherness from the Margins". Organization. 13 (4). SAGE Publications: 463–488. doi:10.1177/1350508406065851. ISSN 1350-5084. S2CID 16218442.
- Maldonado-Torres, Nelson (2007). "On Coloniality of Being". Cultural Studies. 21 (2–3). Informa UK Limited: 240–270. doi:10.1080/09502380601162548. ISSN 0950-2386. S2CID 151309019.
- Mamukwa, E.; Lessem, R.; Schieffer, A. (2016). Integral Green Zimbabwe: An African Phoenix Rising. Integral Green Society and Economy. Taylor & Francis. ISBN 978-1-317-11551-9.
- Mpofu, William (2020). "Coloniality and the Myth of Universalism in the Westernized University". In Mpofu, William; Ndlovu-Gatsheni, S. (eds.). The Dynamics of Changing Higher Education in the Global South. Cambridge Scholars Publisher. ISBN 978-1-5275-5553-2.
- Ndlovu-Gatsheni, Sabelo J. (2013). "Decolonial Epistemic Perspective and Pan-African Identity in the 21st Century". In Muchie, M.; Lukhele-Olorunju, P.; Akpor, O.B. (eds.). The African Union Ten Years After: Solving African Problems with Pan-Africanism and the African Renaissance. Africa Institute of South Africa. ISBN 978-0-7983-0387-3.
- Ndlovu, Morgan (2018). "Coloniality of Knowledge and the Challenge of Creating African Futures". Ufahamu: A Journal of African Studies. 40 (2). California Digital Library (CDL). doi:10.5070/f7402040944. ISSN 2150-5802.
- Poloma, Asabe W.; Szelényi, Katalin (2018). "Coloniality of knowledge, hybridisation, and indigenous survival: exploring transnational higher education development in Africa from the 1920s to the 1960s". Compare: A Journal of Comparative and International Education. Informa UK Limited: 1–19. doi:10.1080/03057925.2018.1445962. ISSN 0305-7925. S2CID 149112783.
- Quijano, Aníbal (2000). "Coloniality of Power and Eurocentrism in Latin America". International Sociology. 15 (2). SAGE Publications: 215–232. doi:10.1177/0268580900015002005. ISSN 0268-5809. S2CID 144941229.
- Mignolo, Walter (2005). "The Idea of Latin America". Blackwell Publishing: 152. ISBN 978-1-405-10085-4.
- Salazar, E.M. (2012). Global Coloniality of Power in Guatemala: Racism, Genocide, Citizenship. Latin American studies. Sociology. Lexington Books. ISBN 978-0-7391-4122-9.
- Silova, Iveta; Millei, Zsuzsa; Piattoeva, Nelli (2017). "Interrupting the Coloniality of Knowledge Production in Comparative Education: Postsocialist and Postcolonial Dialogues after the Cold War". Comparative Education Review. 61 (S1). University of Chicago Press: S74–S102. doi:10.1086/690458. ISSN 0010-4086. S2CID 152179473.
- Steyn, M.; Mpofu, W. (2021). Decolonising the Human: Reflections from Africa on difference and oppression. Wits University Press. ISBN 978-1-77614-655-0.
- Tucker, Karen (2018). "Unraveling Coloniality in International Relations: Knowledge, Relationality, and Strategies for Engagement". International Political Sociology. 12 (3). Oxford University Press (OUP): 215–232. doi:10.1093/ips/oly005. hdl:1983/8295837d-c242-4659-b365-51d09bccf808. ISSN 1749-5679.
