= Data decolonization =

Data decolonization is the process of divesting from colonial, hegemonic models and epistemological frameworks that guide the collection, usage, and dissemination of data related to Indigenous peoples and nations, instead prioritising and centering Indigenous paradigms, frameworks, values, and data practices. Data decolonization is guided by the belief that data pertaining to Indigenous people should be owned and controlled by Indigenous people, a concept that is closely linked to data sovereignty, as well as the decolonization of knowledge.

Data decolonization is linked to the decolonization movement that emerged in the mid-20th century.

== History ==
In various colonial states, data was used to identify Indigenous peoples using Western classification systems, leading to erasure of Indigenous identities, and the origin of narratives that focus on disadvantages in Indigenous communities.

Indigenous knowledge systems were replaced with Western values and systems, devaluing Indigenous ways-of-knowing in the process. Indigenous data practices tend to be more holistic, value diverse, personal opinions, and centre on the person community for their own benefit, rather than Western practices that are closely linked to categorising people as products, replicating colonial structures. Traditions such as oral history, using traditional knowledge, and other practices that were deemed "unscientific" were devalued and replaced with Western ways of knowing that presented as universal and objective. Tools such as the census were used to control narratives about Indigenous peoples, counting Indigenous peoples as they were viewed by the Canadian government rather than how they viewed themselves.

Data decolonization seeks to counter the negative narratives that are reinforced by the colonial data practices that persist in a post-colonial era.

== Principles ==
=== Self-identification ===
Indigenous peoples value the right to self-identify themselves and define their own identities in data collection. Indigenous peoples value the diversity in their communities and wish to see this diversity accounted for in data.

=== Self-determination ===
Indigenous peoples value the right to make decisions about their data. They value the right to control how data is collected about them, how their data is stored, who gets to own the data, and how the data is used.

== In practice ==
=== Policies ===
==== United Nations Declaration on the Rights of Indigenous Peoples ====
The United Nations Declaration on the Rights of Indigenous Peoples (UNDRIP) was first introduced to the General Assembly in 2007. UNDRIP outlines the comprehensive rights of Indigenous peoples, and serves as a guideline for countries seeking reconciliation with their Indigenous populations. Article 18 especially outlines Indigenous rights to have decision-making power in matters that affect their rights, and this affects their data rights as well. Four countries voted against UNDRIP when it was first proposed: Canada, United States, New Zealand, and Australia, although all four would later agree with the declaration.

==== Canada ====
The Canadian government began to endorse UNDRIP in 2010, and they began to fully implement it in 2021. In 2015, the Truth and Reconciliation Commission urged all levels of the Canadian government to adopt the UNDRIP.

==== United States ====
The United States supports the declaration, but does not support the UNDRIP. In 2016, the Organization of American States ratified the American Declaration on the Rights of Indigenous Peoples, which is similar to the UNDRIP.

==== New Zealand ====
New Zealand announced its support for the UNDRIP in 2010, and is currently working with the Māori Development to design and implement their Declaration plan.

=== Healthcare ===
Decolonizing data in healthcare involves reforming healthcare infrastructure and policies to prioritise Indigenous peoples. Current healthcare data structures collect, store, and use data about Indigenous peoples without necessarily consulting the input of Indigenous peoples recreating power dynamics that have previously led to the harm of Indigenous peoples. Decolonizing such structures would put control over healthcare-related data and the use of that data into the hands of Indigenous peoples.

Palestinian Public Health scholar, Danya Qato outlined some principles to guide the creation of decolonized healthcare data systems.

- Centering the community: Centering the concerns and opinions of Indigenous peoples at all levels.
- Diversity: Ensuring that opinions, and decision-making are sourced from various Indigenous communities, rather than a few tokens.
- Transparency: Building complete awareness in Indigenous communities of how their data is collected, aggregated.
- Consent: Prioritising the informed consent of Indigenous peoples, promptly and accurately informing them of all actions that are taken with their data.
- Concrete action: Focusing on action that produces real-world results for Indigenous peoples, rather than discourse for researchers.

== See also ==
- Indigenous decolonization
