= Santiago Castro-Gómez =

Colombian philosopher

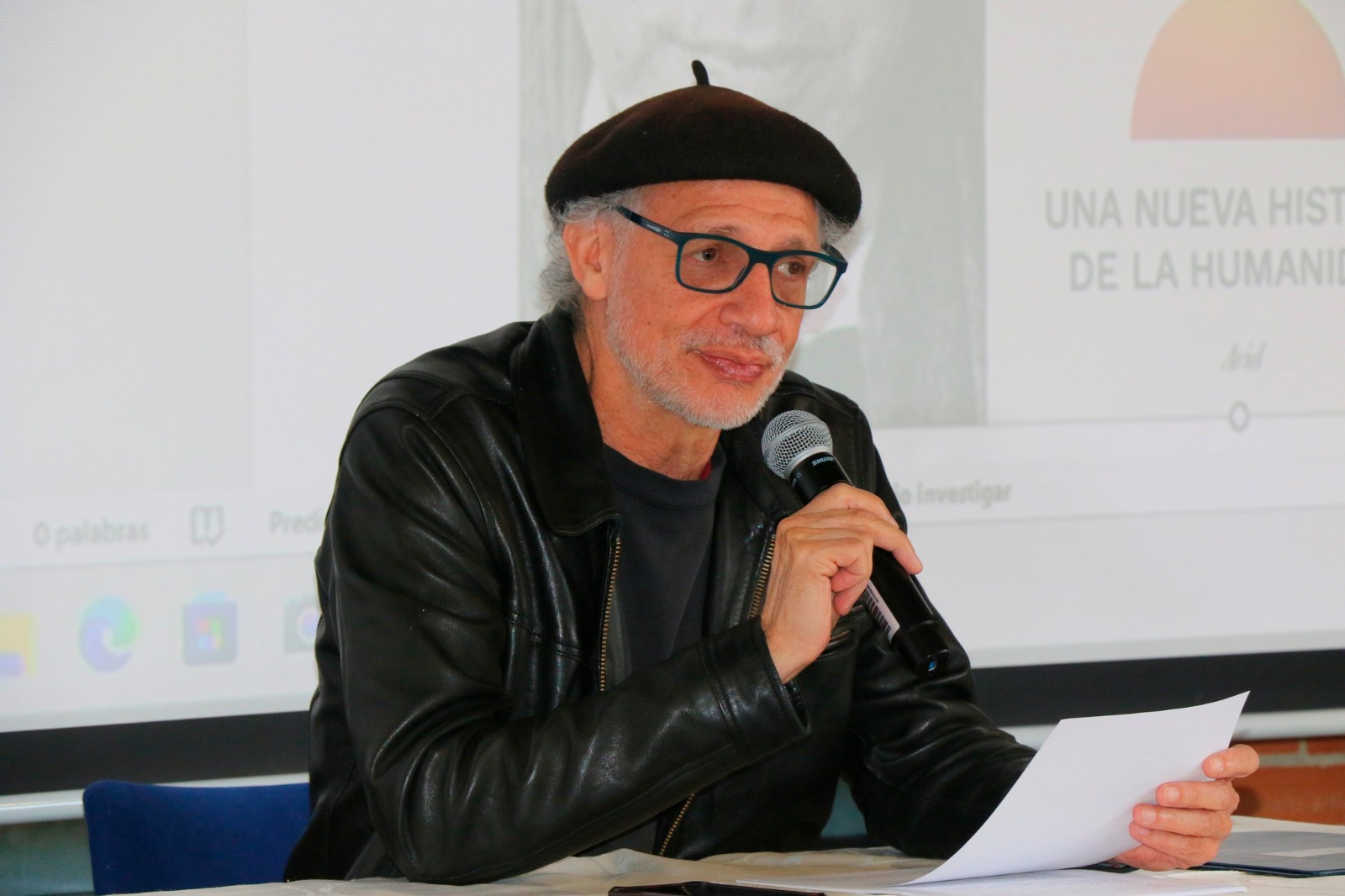

Santiago Castro-Gómez (born 1958, Bogotá, Colombia) is a Colombian philosopher, a professor at the Pontificia Universidad Javeriana and the former director of the Pensar Institute in Bogotá.

== Career and Work ==
Castro-Gómez began studying philosophy at Santo Tomás University in Bogotá, Colombia with members of the "Bogotá Group." He received his M.A. in Philosophy at the University of Tübingen and his Ph.D at the Goethe University Frankfurt am Main in Germany. In addition to his academic positions in Colombia, he has served as visiting professor at Duke University, Pittsburgh University and the Goethe University of Frankfurt.

Castro-Gómez is a public intellectual in Colombia whose work has been the subject of conferences and books, debates over Colombian identity, research on Latin American philosophy, as well as artistic installations. He is the author or co-editor of more than ten books, many of which have been reissued in new editions. As director of the Pensar Institute in Bogotá, he has led an initiative to engage the public, and specifically early public education, on the effects of racism and colonization in Colombian society.

Alongside Aníbal Quijano, Walter Mignolo, Enrique Dussel, Ramón Grosfoguel, Catherine Walsh, Arturo Escobar, Edgardo Lander and Nelson Maldonado-Torres, Castro-Gómez was part of the "Modernity/Coloniality" group, a circle of Latin American critical theorists formed at the beginning of the 21st century. Castro-Gómez's work develops alternatives to dominant approaches and figures in Latin American Philosophy, an intervention he makes explicit in Critique of Latin American Reason (1996). In addition to colleagues like Aníbal Quijano and Walter Mignolo, his major influences include the Frankfurt School, Friedrich Nietzsche, Michel Foucault and Gilles Deleuze.

The work of Castro-Gómez explores the "frontiers" between sociology, anthropology, literary studies and cultural studies, while also reflecting on methodological and epistemological problems within the social sciences. In Zero-Point Hubris, Castro-Gómez characterizes Rene Descartes' 1637 famous statement of "I think, therefore I am" as "the moment white Europeans installed themselves above God as the sole arbiters of knowledge and truth. With this turning point, they began to think of themselves as observers whose scientific methods, morals and ethics overrode those of other cultures."

== Books in Spanish ==
- El tonto y los canallas: Notas para un republicanismo transmoderno (Bogotá: Universidad Javeriana, 2019).
- Historia de la gubernamentalidad II. Filosofía, cristianismo y sexualidad en Michel Foucault (Bogotá: Siglo del Hombre Editores, 2016)
- Revoluciones sin sujeto. Slavoj Zizek y la crítica del historicismo posmoderno. D.F. (México: AKAL 2015).
- Historia de la gubernamentalidad. Razón de estado, liberalismo y neoliberalismo en Michel Foucault (Bogotá: Siglo del Hombre Editores, 2010).
- Tejidos Oníricos. Movilidad, capitalismo y biopolítica en Bogotá, 1910-1930 (Bogotá: Universidad Javeriana 2009).
- Genealogías de la colombianidad: formaciones discursivas y tecnologías de gobierno en los siglos XIX y XX, editores Santiago Castro-Gómez y Eduardo Restrepo (2008).
- Reflexiones para una diversidad epistémica más allá del capitalismo global, editores Santiago Castro-Gómez y Ramón Grosfoguel (Siglo del Hombre Editores, 2007).
- La poscolonialidad explicada a los niños (Editorial Universidad del Cauca, Popayán, 2005).
- La hybris del punto cero. Ciencia, raza e ilustración en la Nueva Granada, 1750-1816 (Bogotá: Universidad Javeriana, 2005).
- Teorías sin disciplina: Latinoamericanismo, poscolonialidad y globalización en debate. Santiago Castro-Gómez y Eduardo Mendieta (1998).
- Crítica de la razón latinoamericana (Barcelona: Puvill Libros, 1996; segunda edición: Bogotá, Editorial Pontificia Universidad Javeriana, 2011).

== Writings in English ==
- Critique of Latin American Reason, translated by Andrew Ascherl (Columbia University Press, 2021).
- Zero-Point Hubris: Science, Race, and Enlightenment in 18th-Century Latin America, translated by Don T. Deere and George Ciccariello-Maher (Rowman & Littlefield International, 2021).
- "The Missing Chapter of Empire: Postmodern Reorganization of Coloniality and Post-Fordist Capitalism" in Globalization and the Decolonial Option (Routledge 2009), pp. 282–302.
- "(Post)Coloniality for Dummies: Latin American Perspectives on Modernity, Coloniality, and the Geopolitics of Knowledge" in Coloniality at Large: Latin America and the Postcolonial Debate, edited by Mabel Moraña, Enrique Dussel, Carlos A. Jáuregui (Duke University Press, 2008).
- "Latin American philosophy as critical ontology of the present: Themes and motifs for a 'critique of Latin American reason,'” In Eduardo Mendieta (ed.), Latin American Philosophy: Currents, Issues, Debates (Indiana University Press, 2003), pp. 68–79.
- "The Social Sciences, Epistemic Violence, and the Problem of the 'Invention of the Other,'" trans. Desiree A. Martin, in Nepantla: Views from South (Duke University Press) Volume 3, Issue 2, 2002, pp. 269–285.
- "The Cultural and Critical Context of Postcolonialism" in Philosophia Africana (Volume 5, Issue 2, August 2002), pp. 25–34.
- "The Convergence of World-Historical Social Science, or Can There Be a Shared Methodology for World-Systems Analysis, Postcolonial Theory and Subaltern Studies?" (with Oscar Guardiola-Rivera) in The Modern/Colonial/Capitalist World-System In The Twentieth Century (Westport Conn.: Greenwood Press, 2002), pp. 237–249.
- “The Challenge of Postmodernity to Latin American Philosophy" in Latin America and Postmodernity: A Contemporary Reader, edited by Pedro Lange-Churion, Eduardo Mendieta (Amherst: Humanity Books, 2001).
- "Traditional and Critical Theories of Culture" in Nepantla: Views From South (Duke University Press, 2000), pp. 503–518.
- "Traditional vs. Critical Cultural Theory," trans. Francisco González and Andre Moskowitz, in Cultural Critique No. 49, Critical Theory in Latin America (Autumn, 2001), pp. 139–154.
- "Latin American Postcolonial Theories" in Peace Review (Taylor and Francis, 1998), pp. 27–33.
