= Aníbal Quijano =

Peruvian sociologist

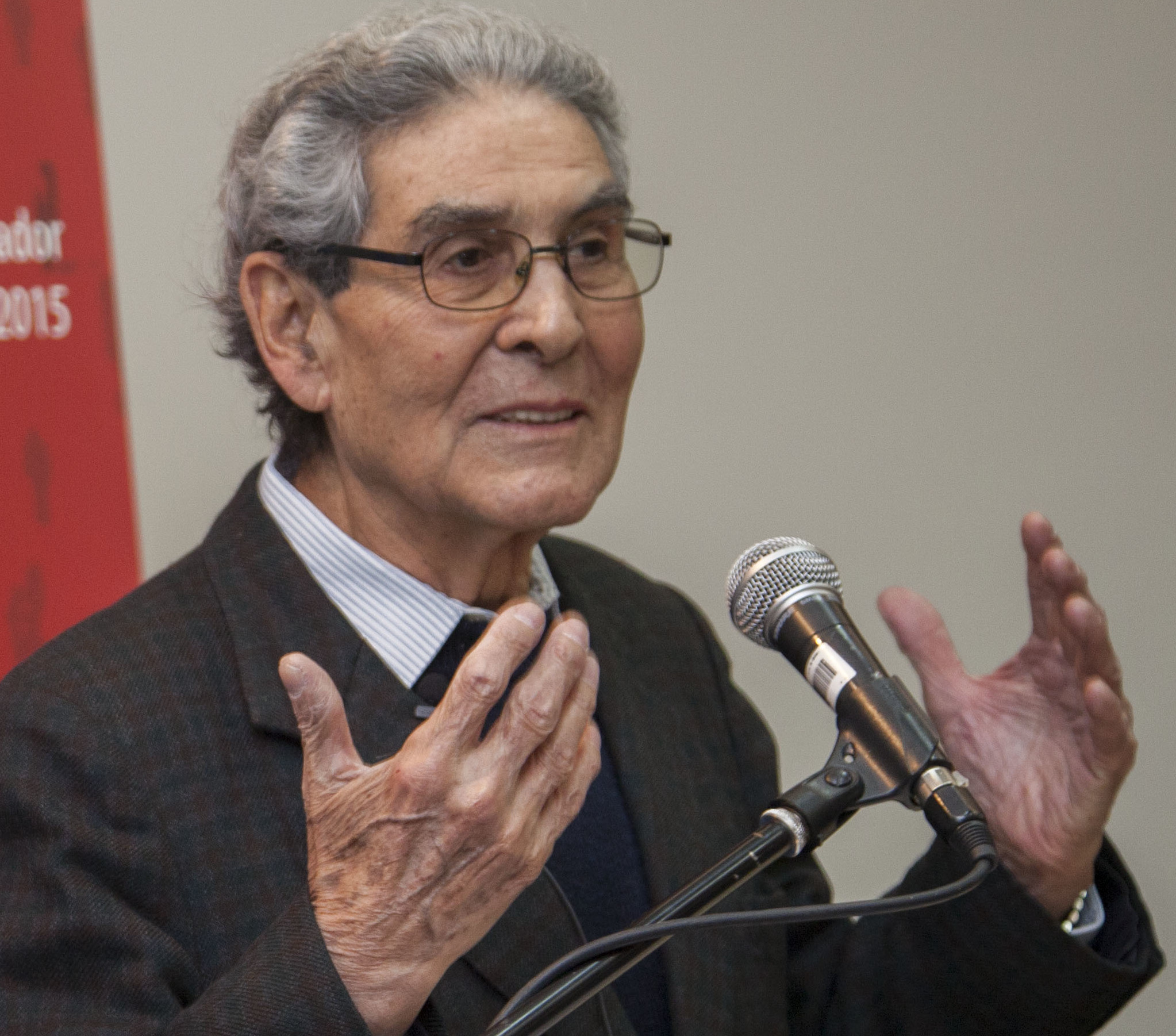
- Quijano in August 2015
- Born: November 17, 1928
- Died: May 31, 2018 (aged 89)
- Education: National University of San Marcos
- Occupation: Sociologist
- Known for: Coloniality of power; Coloniality of knowledge
- Scientific career
- Fields: Decoloniality
- Institutions: National University of San Marcos; Ricardo Palma University; Binghamton University; National Autonomous University of Mexico

Aníbal Quijano (17 November 1930 – 31 May 2018) was a Peruvian sociologist and humanist thinker, known for having developed the concepts of "coloniality of power" and "coloniality of knowledge". His body of work has been influential in the fields of decolonial studies and critical theory.

== Education and academic career ==
Quijano received a Bachelor's degree from the National University of San Marcos (UNMSM), where he enrolled in various courses on Latin American history, anthropology, sociology and law. He later obtained a Master's degree at the Latin American Social Sciences Institute (FLACSO) in Santiago de Chile. He subsequently returned to Lima to study for a PhD at the University of San Marcos, which he completed in 1964.

His PhD examined the emergence of rural-to-urban Indigenous migrants in Peru and the changing roles and contexts of ethnic identity in Latin America. Until 1995, he was senior lecturer at the Faculty of Social Sciences of San Marcos.

He became a professor of the Department of Sociology at Binghamton University, New York. Quijano held several positions as a visiting professor in the social sciences at universities worldwide: Maison des Sciences de l'Homme (Paris), University of São Paulo, University of Puerto Rico, University of Hannover, Free University of Berlin, National University of Ecuador, National Autonomous University of Mexico (UNAM), Universidad de Chile, Latin American School of Economics (ESCOLATINA), and George Washington University. He published works on colonialism, politics, democracy, globalization and other social issues.

== Intellectual Formation ==
Throughout the 1950s he studied the works of Karl Marx, Lenin, Trotsky and other socialist thinkers. But he didn't just follow their ideas, he formed his own opinions. At that time he also worked with documents to learn about slavery in Peru. Quijano taught at schools and kept studying. Quijano helped to come up with ideas that set him apart from other scholars in Latin America.

== Contributions to Sociology and Dependency Theory ==
During the 1960s Quijano wrote key essays on urbanization, social marginalization, Indigenous identity and political change in Latin America. He worked at the Economic Commission for Latin America and the Caribbean also known as ECLAC or CEPAL in Chile from 1966 to 1971. His work there helped develop Dependency Theory.

This theory says that Latin America's underdevelopment resulted from the extraction of their resources by developed or core countries. Quijano’s work on dependency theory is still important today. It explains how Latin America was affected by its ties with richer nations.The Economic Commission for Latin America and the Caribbean played a role in shaping Quijano’s ideas. Essays from the 1960s remain influential in understanding Latin Americas economic challenges.

The dependency theory highlights the impact of economic inequalities on regional development. Latin America's underdevelopment is still a major concern for economists and policymakers.

== Academic Career ==
Later in his life Anibal Quijano taught at universities around the world. He taught at Binghamton University in New York. He also taught at the National Autonomous University of Mexico. He was a teacher at Ricardo Palma University in Peru. His research was about sociology, economics, history and political theory. He studied how colonial systems still affected societies a long time after independence movements finished. Quijano's work showed that colonial systems kept influencing societies. He looked at how colonial systems changed over time. The study of systems and their effects was important to Quijano.

== Political Organizations and Publications ==
In the 1970s Quijano went back to Peru. He got really involved in groups that did not like the government. Quijano worked with people, workers and students. Together they started the Movimiento Revolucionario Socialista, which is also known as the MRS. The MRS was not a group but it made strong friends with labor and student groups in different parts of Peru. The MRS was especially close to the people of Villa El Salvador, where people took care of their community. Quijano and the people of the Movimiento Revolucionario Socialista did a lot of work in this area. The Movimiento Revolucionario Socialista was a group in Peru.

== Sociedad y Politica ==
Quijano helped create the journal Sociedad y Política with Peruvian intellectuals. These intellectuals included Julio Cotler, César Germaná, Felipe Portocarrero and Heraclio Bonilla.

The journal Sociedad y Política talked about socialism and Marxism. It also encouraged many different groups from the Peruvian left to join in.

Quijano was in charge of Sociedad y Política from 1972 to 1983.

== José Carlos Mariategui and Anuario Mariategui ==
Quijano had written extensively about José Carlos Mariátegui. Among his writings was the Prologue to the Biblioteca Ayacucho edition of the 7 Ensayos de Interpretación de la Realidad Peruana, which was originally written in 1978. In 1981 Ediciones Era published Introduccion a Mariátegui, in which he explores Mariátegui's political thought, his approach to imperialism, and his contemporary relevance to Latin American Marxism. In 1991 Quijano edited for Fondo de Cultura Económica a compilation of essential texts by Mariátegui titled Textos Básicos.

After the death of Alberto Tauro, Quijano was invited to co-direct, among with Antonio Melis, the Anuario Mariateguiano. He was involved in the development of the section "La Escena Contemporánea" in which he invited contemporary authors to discuss about a series of topics, and in which some of his ideas about Coloniality of power where originally published.

== Legacy ==
On his death, Aníbal Quijano was remembered as an "important and influential intellectual." The Museo Nacional Centro de Arte Reina Sofia established a chair in his honor to curate events to promote reflection on his work on decolonialization. Anthropologist Rita Laura Segato was named as the inaugural chair in 2018.

== Works ==
- 1965: La emergencia del grupo cholo y sus implicaciones en la sociedad peruana, Ph.D. diss., Universidad de San Marcos, Lima.
- 1965: El movimiento campesino peruano y sus líderes, América Latina, year 8, no.4 (Oct–Dec).
- 1967: Tendencies in Peruvian Development and in the Class Struggle. In James Petras and Maurice Zeitlin, eds, Latin America: Reform Or Revolution. New York: Fawcett.
- 1967: Contemporary Peasant Movements, in S. Lipset and A. Solari, eds, Elites in Latin America. New York: Oxford University Press, pp. 301–342.
- 1969: (with Antonio García) Il Nuovo Marxismo Latinoamericano. A Cura de Giancarlo Santarelli. Milan: Feltrinelli.
- 1969: Urbanisation, Changement Social et Dependance, in Dependance Et Developpement En Amerique Latine. Paris: Anthropos.
- 1969: Urbanization of Society in Latin America, in Urbanization in Latin America. New York: Anchor Books.
- 1970: La Formation du Monde de la Marginalite Urbaine. Espaces et Societes, No. 1, Paris.
- 1971: Nationalism and Capitalism in Perú: a study in neo-imperialism. New York: Monthly Review Press.
- 1973: (with Francisco Weffort ) Die agrarreform in Perú. Gewalt und Ausbeutung. Lateinamerikas Landwirtschaft. Hamburg: Hoffman und Campe
- 1974: Crisis Imperialista y clase obrera en America Latina. Lima
- 1974: Perú: from the conciliation to the confrontation, in Latin America and United States, Changing Political Relations. Stanford: Stanford University Press.
- 1974: Marginal Pole and Marginal Labor Force in Latin America. Economy and Society, London: Routledge, No. 1, 1974
- 1976: Crise Imperialista e Classe Operaria Na America Latina. Coimbra: Centelha.
- 1976: Tendencies of the Working Class. Latin American Perspectives, Issue 8, vol. III, No. 1. Berkeley.
- 1978: Imperialismo, clases sociales y estado en el Perú, 1890–1930: El Perú en la crisis de los años 30, Mosca Azul Ed. 136p.
- 1980: Caractère et Perspective de l’actuel régime militaire au Perou. Michael Löwy's Le Marxisme En Amerique Latine de 1909 a Nos Jours: Une Anthologie. Paris
- 1986: Die Enterstehung einer Marginalen Welt in den Latein Amerikanischen Stadten. Soziale Bewegungen und Raumliche Strukturen In Latein Amerika. Kassel: Gesamthochschulbibliothek.
- 1989: Identidad y Utopía en América Latina. Quito: Ediciones El Conejo.
- 1989: Quijano, Anibal. "Paradoxes of modernity in Latin America". International Journal of Politics, Culture and Society. 3 (2): 147–177. doi:10.1007/BF01387928. ISSN 0891-4486.
- 1991: Colonialidad y Modernidad/Racionalidad. Perú Indígena, vol. 13, No. 29, pp. 11–20. Lima: Instituto Indigenista Peruano
- 1992: (with Immanuel Wallerstein) Americanity as a concept. Or The Americas in the Modern World-System. International Social Science Journal, No. 134, Nov. 1992, UNESCO, Paris.
- 1994: Colonialité du Pouvoir et Democratie en Amerique Latine. Future Anterieur: Amérique Latine, Democratie Et Exclusion. Paris: L'Harmattan.
- 1995: El Fujimorismo y el Peru, Seminario de Estudios y Debates Socialistas. Lima, 48p.
- 1998: Work in a turning point?. ISA Bulletin 75–76, Spring. Madrid: Universidad Complutense.
- 1998: Colonialidad, Poder, Cultura y Conocimiento en América Latina. In Anuario Mariateguiano, vol. IX, No. 9, pp..113–122. Lima: Amauta.
- 1999: Coloniality and Modernity/Rationality. In Goran Therborn, ed. Globalizations and Modernities. Stockholm: FRN.
- 2000: Colonialidad y Clasificación Social, Journal of World Systems Research, vol. VI, No. 2, Fall/Winter, pp. 342–388. Giovanni Arrighi and Walter L. Goldfrank, eds. Colorado.
- 2000: Coloniality of Power, Eurocentrism and Latin America. Nepantla, No. 3, Durham, North Carolina: Duke University Press.
- 2002: The Return of the Future and Questions about Knowledge. Current Sociology, vol. 50. Thousand Oaks, London: SAGE Publications, New Delhi.
- 2006. Estado-nación y movimientos indígenas en la región Andina: cuestiones abiertas. OSAL, Observatorio Social de America Latina, año VI, no. 19. CLACSO, Consejo Latinoamericano de Ciencias Sociales, Buenos Aires. Julio.
- 2007: Colonialidad y clasificación social, in Santiago Castro-Gómez y Ramón Grosfoguel, eds, El giro decolonial. Reflexiones para una diversidad epistémica más allá del capitalismo global. Bogotá: Siglo del Hombre Editores.
- 2010: Coloniality and Modernity/Rationality, Chapter 2, pp. 22 – 32, in Globalization and the Decolonial Option, ed. by Walter Mignolo & Árturo Escobar, Routledge, London & New York.
- 2010: Die Paradoxien der eurozentrierten kolonialen Moderne' in Prokla – Zeitschrift für kritische Sozialwissenschaft 40 (1), Heft 158, 29–47.
- 2024: Quijano, Aníbal (1 March 2024). Aníbal Quijano: Foundational Essays on the Coloniality of Power. Duke University Press. doi:10.1215/9781478059356. ISBN 978-1-4780-5935-6.

== See also ==
- Dependency theory
- World system theory
