= Pedro Lasch =

Mexican visual artist

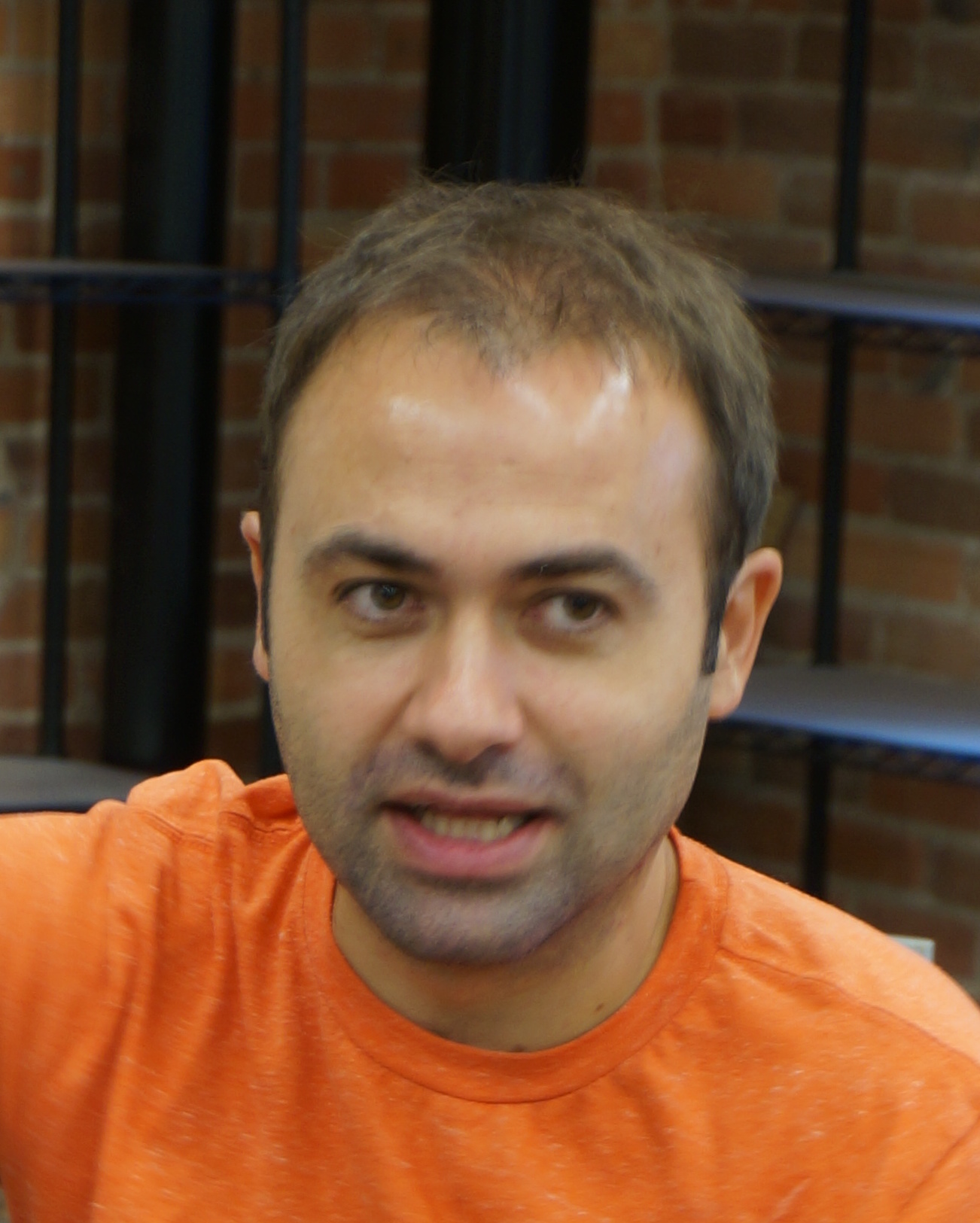
- Lasch teaches a painting class at Duke University in 2013
- Born: 1975 (age 50–51); Mexico City
- Website: www.pedrolasch.com

Pedro Lasch is a visual artist born in 1975 in Mexico City, and based in the U.S. since 1994. He produces works of conceptual art, institutional critique, social practice, and site-specific art, as well as paintings, photographs, prints, and other traditional media. His art has intersected with the international immigrants’ movement, and the philosophies of critical pedagogy, radical democracy, and the coloniality of power. He is a research professor in art and art theory in the Department of Art, Art History, and Visual Studies at Duke University, where he is also the Founding Director of the Artistic Research Initiative & Social Practice Lab Fellowship Program.

== Exhibition History ==
Lasch has exhibited at the Venice Biennale and Creative Time Summit Venice, been featured in the AND AND AND platform of dOCUMENTA (13), and collaborated with Atis Rezistans/Ghetto Biennale for documenta fifteen. He has also participated in the Havana Biennial, the Gwangju Biennale and group exhibitions at MoMA PS1, Contemporary Art Center New Orleans, Hayward Gallery, Centro Nacional de las Artes, and MUAC.

Lasch's first museum retrospective, Pedro Lasch: Entre líneas / Between the Lines, was presented in 2023–2024 by Mexico's Ministry of Culture (SC) and the National Institute of Fine Arts and Literature (INBAL), through Laboratorio Arte Alameda.

From 19 October 2023 - 11 February 2024, Pedro Lasch. Inverse Figurations was exhibited at the Museo de Arte Abstracto Español, Cuenca. It features the Spanish premiere of Lasch's Espejo Negro (Black Mirror) project.

Additional major solo exhibitions and projects have been shown in The Phillips Collection, Nasher Museum of Art, Sean Kelly Gallery, and Galería del Palacio Nacional. Lasch's first major solo exhibition, at the Queens Museum of Art in New York, was named as the best of the year by Michael Rakowitz in Artforum.

== Major Works ==
=== Abstract Nationalism ===
Conceived in 2001, but first presented at The Phillips Collection in Washington, DC (2014), the series Abstract Nationalism includes video works, visual scores, paintings, musical performances, and various media associated with socially engaged art. Channeling the emotional and cultural associations towards anthems and flags, the series addresses notions of independence, colonialism, (multi)nationalism, migrations, and mapping, all so deeply related to the history of nations and cultures. .

=== Black Mirror ===
The Black Mirror series began when the Nasher Museum of Art commissioned a new work to accompany their exhibition From El Greco to Velázquez: Art during the Reign of Phillip III. The series as a whole, with its play of transparencies and reflections, makes impossible any clear separation between past-present, artwork-viewer-environment, or the pre- and post-Columbian. Site-specific installations and artworks in the series have since been produced at the National Palace Art Gallery in Mexico City, MUAC, Prospect New Orleans, and M.S. Rau. In 2015, it was one of seven finalists to represent Mexico at its Venice Biennial Pavilion.

=== Phantom Limbs & TTGG ===
Phantom Limbs, a 9/11 memorial painting series and installation (produced between October 2001 and July 2011) was presented as an intervention within institutions and museums that house Western canonical paintings and contemporary art. Each work in this series corresponds to a place in the world where the New York Twin Towers are fictionally reconstructed as an international memorial. Some of these places are contested territories or relevant sites for international affairs between 2001 and 2011. Twin Towers Go Global is a new media work that complements the Phantom Limbs series and shares much of the same research material.

=== Latino/a America & Naturalizations ===
During the peak of the 2006 United States immigration reform protests, three projects, Naturalizations, LATINO/A AMERICA, and Tianguis Transnacional were presented in Lasch's first major solo exhibition at the Queens Museum of Art in New York. LATINO/A AMERICA is a conceptual series of the presentation and distribution of a new map of the American continent. The Tianguis Transnacional series is defined by a steady exploration of the aesthetic, social, and political manifestations of informal trade. Naturalizations is a work in progress based on the production and distribution of a set of masks inviting wearers to constantly question “the natural,” and those institutions - religious, mythological or governmental - which claim to know what is “natural.”

=== ART of the MOOC ===
ART of the MOOC is a series of free massive open online courses (MOOCs) designed by Lasch to simultaneously serve as an international work of public art. Video lectures, complementary materials, and presentations by cross-national artists, curators, critics, and activists provide a formal and theoretical overview of the fundamental themes within socially-engaged public art. Originally produced by Creative Time in 2015, the series is now permanently available through Coursera.

=== Social Practice Lab & Artistic Research Initiative ===
The Social Practice Lab (SPL) brings together scholars, artists, and activists through signature projects and public interventions. Founded and directed by Lasch, the SPL is housed within the Franklin Humanities Institute at Duke University. With major funding awarded by the Mellon Foundation, the SPL facilitates the Artistic Research Initiative (ARI) Fellows Program. ARI Fellows are offered a unique opportunity to address challenging topics, jump-start experiments, manufacture prototypes, and create social and performative models that can then be applied to both public and professional spheres.

== Biography ==
Lasch studied art at the Cooper Union with Dore Ashton, Hans Haacke, Day Gleeson, and Doug Ashford (Group Material), and later completed an MFA in Fine Arts at Goldsmiths, University of London. Lasch has been regularly involved with the New York art and politics collective 16 Beaver Group since 2000.

Between 1999 and 2004, Lasch created a series of simultaneously local and transnational social projects with immigrant and indigenous groups in Chiapas and Quintana Roo (Mexico), and Jackson Heights (Queens, New York). In collaboration with grassroots organizations like Asociación Tepeyac de New York and Mexicanos Unidos de Queens, Lasch founded and directed the experimental afterschool program Art, Story-Telling, and the Five Senses (El arte, el cuento y los cinco sentidos). This pedagogical work received consecutive years of support from artist Robert Motherwell’s Dedalus Foundation, and it included noted guest participants such as Ricardo Dominguez from Electronic Disturbance Theater.

Lasch has taught at Duke University since 2002. During his years at Duke, Lasch's work has developed in an intellectual environment that includes influential figures in critical theory such as Fredric Jameson, Katherine Hayles, and Mark Anthony Neal. His co-publications and direct artistic collaborations with colleagues there include projects with Esther Gabara, Walter Mignolo, Michael Hardt, Kristine Stiles, and Ariel Dorfman, as well as the staff of the Nasher Museum of Art. Lasch has also served on various public and private boards, including the North Carolina Arts Council (2007–2010), and he occasionally curates exhibitions of other artists’ work that complement his artistic production.
