= Decolonization of higher education in South Africa =

Contemporary social movement

Decolonization is the dismantling of colonial systems that were established during the period of time when a nation maintains dominion over dependent territories. The Cambridge Dictionary lists decolonization as "the process in which a country that was previously a colony (i.e. controlled by another country) becomes politically independent." However, this definition does not capture the agency of the "masses", as Frantz Fanon referred to them, and their role in this process. Fanon's ideas regarding the agency involved in shaping one's own path reflects the notion that "decolonization can only happen when the native takes up his or her responsible subjecthood and refuses to occupy the position of violence-absorbing passive victim." Specifically in the context of higher education in South Africa, decolonization represents a further dismantling of western centered institutions, systems, symbolism, and standards within the higher education system. It goes beyond just filling the void left by colonialism and Apartheid with the presence of marginalized bodies, and promotes the decolonization of the purpose and functions of higher education itself.

== Context ==
=== Higher Education created in a Colonial and Apartheid Context (1910-1994) ===
Engaging colonialism's, and subsequently Apartheid's, mark on South Africa's higher education system is instrumental to understanding the policies and reports subsequently created to remedy the inequalities that manifested as a result of these systems.

Of particular notice in the long and varied history of higher education in South Africa, is the period after the establishment of the country in 1910. With the 1913 Natives Land Act, South Africa was legally segregated; black people were indigenized and pushed out onto reserves.

After the Afrikaner Nationalist Party won the 1948 General Election, the policy of Apartheid began with force. The government continued the indigenization of indigenous Africans through the "Policy of Separate Development"—the dividing up of Africans by tribe—and the creation of “Bantu groups”, who were each given their own homelands or Bantustans—which were separate nations. The policy of Apartheid impacted every aspect of black life: where they lived; where they worked; and even where, what and how they learned.

Each of the Bantustans had their own universities (designated by the Bantu Education Act of 1958), and South Africa as a whole had divided the higher education system along color lines. There were 11 universities reserved for and serving mainly white people; 5 of which were Afrikaans, 4 were English and two were bilingual. Indians—along with some colored people—were designated to attend the University of Durban-Westville—who defiantly opened their doors to all races in 1984—and Colored people were designated to attend the University of the Western Cape. Those educated at the University of the Western Cape received an education that was primarily focused on imparting vocational and technical skills for low to medium level jobs.

In the Bantustans, universities were built and maintained with the primary objective of teaching black people technical skills for fields like agriculture, commercial and industry, military and health. Since high skilled and high paying jobs were secured for whites, they were limited to low level positions within the Bantustans. After wide protests against Bantu education in 1976 and the Soweto uprising—which resulted in the deaths of 87 school children—in 1977, the Apartheid government implemented the Education and Training Act of 1979. This repealed the Bantu Education Act of 1953 and the Bantu Special Education Act of 1964. The Education and Training Act was passed with the intent of appeasing blacks and turning the tides of protests. However, the act did not do much to change the system of education for black South Africans and South Africans of color; universities continued to be segregated and subpar education and low level training continued to be reserved for these non-white populations.

=== Higher Education under Transformation ===
With the election of the new government in 1994, particular policies were passed to correct the damage of Apartheid in the realm of education; the most noteworthy of these were the White Paper, the Higher Education Act 101, and the National Plan for Higher Education on the national scale as well as university specific Transformation policies.

==== Transformation Laws ====
The “White Paper 3: A Programme for the Transformation of higher education” was a report documenting South Africa's transition from Apartheid and minority rule to a democracy. The White Paper notes higher education as playing a “critical role in the social, cultural and economic development of modern societies”. It lays out specific initiatives to transform higher education based on the principles of: equity and redress; democratization; development; quality; effectiveness and efficiency; academic freedom; institutional autonomy; and public accountability. Its goals at the national level were to “conceptualize, plan, govern and fund higher education in South Africa as a single, coordinated system” and through that system push forward diversity and equity programs that aimed to “provide advanced educational opportunities for an expanding population”. At the institutional level, the report called for the “[transformation] and [democratization of] the governance structures of higher education” in an effort to allow for the various “stakeholders who recognize different identities, interests and freedoms” to also pursue a cooperative and coordinated goal.

The Higher Education Act 101 of 1997 was passed to regulate higher education and specifically to “provide the establishment, composition and functions of a council on Higher education” as well as “to provide for transitional arrangements” in higher education. It mandated “restructure and transform programs and institutions” that would better respond to the needs of South Africa as well as redress past inequalities, provide equalized opportunity.

The National Plan for Higher Education was passed in February 2001 and the goal was to shape the implementation of Transformation and the policy goals of the White Paper in higher education. In the “Briefing by the Minister on National Plan for Higher Education” in March 2001, The Minister of Education, Professor Kader Asmal goes into depth about the importance of such a plan and its expected outcomes before the educational portfolio committee. Asmal begins by stressing the need to proceed with Transformation meticulously and consciously or risk the destruction of tertiary education in South Africa. He also mentions how higher education should not depend upon the market. He states that tertiary education “are the engines of the growth of skilled citizens and intellectuals, particularly black intellectuals” and that the plan “is designed to meet the needs of the country” especially in the categories of “scientists and teachers, not just people skilled in information technology”. Asmal notes that the system is not meeting the needs of South African society. He notes that the plan intends to address the following three key challenges in higher education: inequality and inefficiency; addressing the skills and human resource needs of the country; administrative, management and financial issues.

==== University-level Transformation measures ====
The current Transformation program of the University of Cape Town (UCT) focuses on the goals of non-racialization—the decentralizing and dismantling of historical Apartheid categories in an effort to diminish their effect on admissions, academic success and likelihood for promotion—diversity, inclusivity and engagement with African voices. Specifically, the program states the need for better representation in the faculty and student body as well as improving the cultivation of intellectual diversity, especially in the giving a platform to African voices—whom have been marginalized in academia. The program states that students must have critical knowledge and understanding of the country's history and the experiences of its citizens. Also, students need to be able to connect this knowledge to their own studies and future work and must have a critical understanding of how current mainstream academic epistemology has roots in embedded power relations that have centralized and prioritized European knowledge and ways of thinking.

UCT has recently established specific policies under their 2015 Transformation Program. The policies refer to important aspects in the calls for “decolonization” of South African universities, specifically representation. The goal of these particular policies is to respond to the calls to decolonize and transform the university from a white dominated environment. There are two parts: the Student Equity Policy (2004); and the Employment Equity Plan (2015-2020). The Student Equity policy directly refers to the concerns of the disproportionate student body. These policies came out of the passing of three particular reports and acts: The White Paper on Higher Education; the Higher Education Act; the National Plan on Higher Education. The equity policy aims to promote equality of access through positive discrimination in admissions, or affirmative action, aiming to admit and matriculate students from underrepresented backgrounds, as well as a promotion of equality in outcomes by providing support to students once they are on campus.

Similarly, the university is also attempting to diversify the faculty, especially in regards to the number of tenured faculty of color and women of color. White male professors overwhelmingly make up the majority of tenured and teaching faculty at the university, while the numbers of black, colored and Indian male and female professors are minimal, if non-existent. The university claims particular barriers in recruiting potential employees from these backgrounds. Particularly the difficulty in attracting these candidates to the university with the prevalent atmosphere of exclusivity, a perception that university does not do enough to support faculty members of these backgrounds, and the high number of tenured faculty who are static and the lack of open posts. The university lists particular actions to help ameliorate these barriers and the current representation problem. The plan is an affirmative action plan that prioritizes career development programs that allow candidates to grow into their positions, create a pipeline to target and recruit recent graduates, fill vacancies more consciously, creating an affirmative and inclusive environment. These policies, while a step in the right direction to incorporate disenfranchised communities into the fabric of the university, they don't necessarily address the ability of students of color, and especially black students, to empower themselves through their education and disrupt European and Western dominant holds on the means and methods of learning.

== Philosophy ==
=== Frantz Fanon ===
In Frantz Fanon's The Wretched of the Earth, he explored the idea of decolonization by focusing on the conditions of colonization and the process of decolonization. He describes decolonization as the implementation of the statement, “The last shall be first.” This means that the systems and institutions in place that privilege a particular group need to be replaced with ones that redistribute privilege to those who have previously denied. In this vein of reordering society, Fanon engages with the impact that the “black elite” can have on that process; he specifically notes how the black elite— who are mostly western educated and trained— continue the colonial practices and their educational background can become a crutch that impedes change and progress in the post-colonial nation. As Fanon states, decolonization is a process of “disorder”.

=== Steve Biko ===
In the collection of his writings in I write what I like, Steve Biko discusses the ideas of liberation, decolonization, pride and black consciousness. He notes that how during Apartheid, Africans and all things African have been given an inferior status. He explains how this devaluation and oppression of black people have contributed to an environment in which black people live in “denigration and derision”. This manifests in black people living in a demoralized state as they have internalized their oppression. He advocates on behalf of black consciousness as a means of promoting black pride, equality and value. He identifies two stages in the Black Conscious Movement, “Psychological Liberation” and “Physical Liberation”. Psychological liberation refers to the empowerment black people would experience out of a positive change in mindset regarding their blackness. Biko wrote that “we cannot be conscious of ourselves and yet remain in bondage. We want to attain the envisioned self which is a free self.”

=== Achille Mbembe ===
In his article “Decolonizing the University: New Directions”, Achille Mbembe discusses the limits placed on the decolonization efforts by the forces of neoliberalism and its connection to decolonization. He states that the role of the university is to “encourage students to develop their own intellectual and moral lives” as well as “redistribute equally the capacity to make disciplined inquiries into things we need to know”. By creating a representative and affirming environment also gives way to the fostering of creativity and ingenuity on college campuses. This force of creativity can be sparked through dismantling market tied learning to allow for, what Mbembe refers to as, this “free pursuit of knowledge”. By dissociating knowledge with capitalistic pressures, there can be a greater focus of energy on developing new epistemology and ontology in a South African context. It also can allow for the understanding the value of knowledge in other ways. However, he notes that higher education has been severely marketized and commercialized. Here, he claims there is a need to decolonize the spaces of management and access so that students can actually pursue knowledge freely. Furthermore, Mbembe argues that this approach can counter student interest in material versus epistemological payoff. Mbembe discusses the term decolonization, and questions whether we need to dismantle historical systems and institutions or instead focus on systems that have mutated and changed over time.

== Student Movements ==
Student movements and participation across South African Universities have been crucial to the conversation of decolonization of higher education and academic spaces. In the past decade, movements like Rhodes Must Fall, Fees Must Fall and Decolonize UCT Law showcase student dissent and an attempt to decenter the whiteness at the university level and increase marginalized access to education. These organizations do not request seats at the metaphoric, institutional table, but instead push for people to question, reevaluate and reimagine the legitimacy and function of the university in a post-apartheid and post-colonial setting.

== See also ==
- Decolonization of knowledge
- Decolonization of public space
