= Indigenous decolonization =

Political process of reframing Indigenous histories

Indigenous decolonization describes ongoing theoretical and political processes whose goal is to contest and reframe narratives about indigenous community histories and the effects of colonial expansion, cultural assimilation, exploitative Western research, and often though not inherent, genocide. Indigenous people engaged in decolonization work adopt a critical stance towards western-centric research practices and discourse and seek to reposition knowledge within Indigenous cultural practices.

The decolonial work that relies on structures of western political thought has been characterized as paradoxically furthering cultural dispossession. In this context, there has been a call for the use of independent intellectual, spiritual, social, and physical reclamation and rejuvenation even if these practices do not translate readily into political recognition. Scholars may also characterize indigenous decolonization as an intersectional struggle that "cannot liberate all people without first addressing racism and sexism."

Beyond the theoretical dimensions of indigenous-decolonization work, direct action campaigns, healing journeys, and embodied social struggles for decolonization are frequently associated with ongoing native resistance struggles and disputes over land rights, ecological extraction, political marginalization, and sovereignty. While native resistance struggles have gone on for centuries, an upsurge of indigenous activism took place in the 1960s - coinciding with national liberation movements in Africa, Asia, and the Americas.

== Methods ==
=== Indigenous Postcolonial Theory ===
Coined by Anna Lees, the methodology of "Indigenous Postcolonial Theory" builds upon and draws clear distinctions from other schools of postcolonial or decolonial thought. First, the prefix post– doesn’t refer to a period of time, but rather a perpetual ambition of eradicating the political and social power imbalances and effects of colonization that manifest in efforts to culturally assimilate and stereotype Native Americans. Secondly, Indigenous Postcolonial Theory was developed as an alternative method to exercising a broad, blanket critical theory to particularly center indigenous knowledge and values rather than applying a wholesale form of decolonization to Indigenous-specific trauma, strive, love, and joy. Similarly, Marie Battiste posits that Indigenous Postcolonial Theory offers a method of deconstructing the layers and intricacies of colonization, its effect, and its underlying assumptions, in a way that Eurocentric theory is unable to do. She says, "[IPT] is based on our pain and our experiences, and it refuses to allow others to appropriate this pain and these experiences."

=== Survivance, sovereignty, and rhetorical sovereignty ===
Gerald Vizenor coined the term survivance to characterize the struggle of colonized indigenous communities. Combining the words "survival" and "resistance", he evokes "the duality of how Native Americans have survived brutal genocides and continue to resist white supremacist laws and culture that are designed to disenfranchise and assimilate". According to Vizenor, "Survivance is an active sense of presence, the continuance of native stories, not a mere reaction, or survivable name. Native survivance stories are renunciation of dominance, tragedy, and victimry." Thus, survivance is defined as "the resistance (of) colonial tendencies to resign indigeneity to the past by characterizing an ongoing state of being in response to colonizing efforts."

According to King, Gubele, and Anderson, the study and "decolonization" of Native American Indigeneity "requires an understanding of the importance of sovereignty to American Indian nations…" In this context, he defines sovereignty as including the localized self-determination of a people, as well as the political authority of nationhood and the recognition of equal-status with similarly sovereign international peers. King, Gubele, and Anderson believe that not only is this crucial for political purposes, but it's crucial for cultural and religious purposes, as well: "For Native nations, this kind of a nation is defined by a peoplehood, a concept that has its roots in the preservation and prospering of the community and binds its members together in cultural and often religious terms."

Citing the history of changes in US legislative terminology that sequentially redefined indigenous "nations" to "tribes" and "treaties" to "agreements", Stephen R. Lyons sought to generate a standard of "rhetorical sovereignty". Lyons looks at what he identifies as being "the communicative practices of the colonizer", and how consequently, indigenous representations and freedoms are constrained, as a result. He says, "Rhetorical sovereignty is the inherent right of peoples to determine their own communicative needs and desires in this pursuit, to decide for themselves the goals, modes, styles, and languages of public discourse." In essence, the ambition of Indigenous rhetorical sovereignty is the desire to give rhetorical control, and thus representational control, to Indigenous ethnic groups.

=== Narrative, counter-storytelling, and testimonies ===
Thomas King states in his book The Truth about Stories: A Native Narrative that stories have a substantial impact on the human condition and humans’ constructed reality as a whole. They frame human relationships, perspectives, and moral codes. As King, Gubele, and Anderson put it, "The stories we tell each other tell us who we are, locate us in time and space and history and land, and suggest who gets to speak and how." Similarly, the stories that are widely disseminated or suppressed indicate similar societal expectations and limitations. Norman Denzin, Yvonna Lincoln, and Linda Smith, in their book titled "Handbook of Critical and Indigenous Methodologies", assert that "The Euro-American canon and its continuance of Greco-Roman traditions has deliberately marginalized indigenous stories that manifest in practices of theorizing, speaking, writing, and making", and that the telling of such stories would provide "alternatives to and challenge dominant narratives", thus becoming counter-narratives to them.

Linda Tuhiwai Smith writes that storytelling is a means of connecting past generations to the future ones and the land to the community by "passing down the beliefs and values of a culture in the hope that the new generations will treasure them and pass the story down further." The themes and motifs of these stories pass down shared histories, knowledge, and cultural identity that can range from "humour and gossip and creativity… [to] love, sexual encounters, … [and] war and revenge."

Indigenous testimonies are a means and practice of pushing back against oppression and suppression by providing oral evidence about a painful experience or series of experiences. Linda Tuhiwai Smith writes that testimonies are contingent on a formal structure, a supportive atmosphere and audience, and upholding "a notion that truth is being revealed ‘under oath.’"

=== Food sovereignty ===
It has been speculated that food sovereignty is a means of providing a path towards decolonization. Its definition, in recent years, has been noted to be highly modifiable due to its dependency on the context of the circumstances to which it is applied. In indigenous context, where sovereignty does not serve the right meaning and political intent, the concept of food sovereignty sometimes does not follow the traditional meanings of each individual word.

It has been discussed and theorized in the indigenous context of the concept that food sovereignty is also an effort of reclaiming culture and former relationship to land; it has also been noted that, as a situational concept, food sovereignty in the traditional sense may have underlying traces of capitalist or colonialist interests. Food sovereignty's adaptable definition in the context of indigenous decolonization, in relation to the reclamation of culture, is then highly hypothesized to be a strong route towards decolonization.

== Challenges and initiatives ==
=== Reclaiming indigenous knowledge and practices ===
Indigenous knowledge and practices are deeply embedded in Indigenous cultures and encompass a wide array of systems, including traditional ecological knowledge, spiritual beliefs, healing practices, storytelling, and artistic expressions. However, the historical colonization of Indigenous communities has systematically devalued and suppressed these knowledge systems. Colonial powers have imposed Western worldviews and systems on indigenous communities suppressing their cultures, languages, and spiritual beliefs. To address this, scholars like Winona LaDuke advocate for the reclamation and revitalization of Indigenous knowledge as an integral part of the decolonization process.

Organizations such as the First Peoples' Cultural Council in Canada and the Advocates for Indigenous California Language Survival in the United States actively work to revitalize Indigenous languages and support language revitalization initiatives. The First Peoples' Cultural Council, in particular, prioritizes cultural revitalization and youth engagement within Canada. They offer funding, training, and resources for language programs, traditional arts, and cultural preservation projects and utilize digital platforms to make cultural knowledge accessible while respecting Indigenous protocols.

=== Overcoming symbolic and superficial decolonization ===
Despite the abundance of decolonization efforts, many of them are symbolic and superficial and fail to address the underlying structures of power and inequality. These approaches often create an illusion of progress without effectively addressing the systemic injustices faced by Indigenous communities. One such gesture is the renaming of a school after an Indigenous leader. This tokenistic gesture is done in place of incorporating Indigenous knowledge systems into their curricula or providing substantial support to Indigenous students and communities. In response, scholars like Tuck and Yang criticize these gestures and emphasize the importance of challenging systems of colonization through the acknowledgment of Indigenous rights through substantive actions like land repatriation.

More recent efforts towards land repatriation come from The Indigenous Land Stewardship - an initiative led by Indigenous communities and organizations such as the Native Land Conservancy and the Cultural Conservancy. They prioritize land repatriation, ecological restoration, and the revitalization of traditional land management practices, ensuring that Indigenous peoples have control and decision-making power over their ancestral territories.

=== Sovereignty and borders ===
Sovereignty and borders is also a contested issue in the decolonization process, particularly within the context of settler colonialism. Reclaiming Indigenous lands and asserting political autonomy are key components of challenging the structures of settler governance. Sovereignty allows Indigenous peoples to govern themselves according to their own laws, traditions, and values, reinforcing their cultural identity and promoting the revitalization of Indigenous knowledge and practices. Recognizing the artificial nature of borders is crucial, as they often hinder Indigenous self-determination and governance. A notable example comes from the lack of acknowledgment of the Mohawk people's sovereign right to cross the US-Canada border that predates Canada and the U.S.

Efforts led by organizations like the Native American Rights Fund (NARF) aim to defend tribal sovereignty, protect treaty rights, support land and resource reclamation, and address border-related issues impacting Indigenous communities. Through legal representation and advocacy, NARF defends tribal sovereignty, protects treaty rights, and supports efforts to reclaim ancestral lands and resources. They also address border-related issues impacting Indigenous communities and work towards the recognition of traditional border-crossing rights.

=== Decolonizing education ===
Decolonizing education aims to challenge and transform existing educational systems that have historically perpetuated colonization and marginalized Indigenous knowledge and ways of knowing. In particular, it aims to center Indigenous knowledge systems, languages, and cultural perspectives within educational institutions. Battiste in particular emphasizes the importance of revitalizing Indigenous languages and traditions, promoting Indigenous ways of knowing. She promotes Indigenous ways of knowing in education and fostering cultural pride and identity among Indigenous students.

Organizations like the National Association for Indigenous Studies (NAISA) also advocate for decolonizing education through transforming curricula, promoting Indigenous methodologies, revitalizing languages and cultures, and supporting Indigenous teacher education. Their work aims to challenge colonial legacies and create culturally responsive and inclusive educational environments.

=== Indigenous research methods ===
Prioritizing Indigenous research methodologies is also essential in decolonizing research practices and generating knowledge that serves Indigenous communities. Shawn Wilson's book "Research is Ceremony: Indigenous Research Methods" promotes the use of Indigenous research approaches rooted in Indigenous protocols, ethics, and knowledge systems. It emphasizes community engagement, reciprocity, and the affirmation of Indigenous perspectives and voices. Similarly, Linda Tuhiwai Smith highlights the importance of centering Indigenous worldviews and methodologies while respecting cultural protocols, including obtaining free, prior, and informed consent.

NAISA also promotes Indigenous research methods through various initiatives including organizing research methodology workshops, developing Indigenous research ethics guidelines, and providing platforms for sharing Indigenous knowledge and research findings. They also support Indigenous researchers through mentorship programs, networking opportunities, and research funding emphasizing collaboration with Indigenous communities. They also encourage community-driven research that respects cultural protocols and community ownership.

== Implications of Western knowledge production and epistemologies ==
As Western scientists and academics have and continue to take advantage of knowledge from and about Indigenous communities (whether in publications or through new pharmaceuticals), those Indigenous communities are excluded from control over the nature and usage of the newly created knowledge. Thus, Indigenous communities are spoken for and become the indigenous "other" as those institutional systems and structures reproduce a knowledge that "becomes a commodity of colonial exploitation". This continues to reinforce the privileging of Western knowledge and epistemologies over non-Western or Indigenous funds of knowledge (or traditional knowledge) in Western academia. This privilege manifests itself when, according to Norman K. Denzin and Yvonna S. Lincoln, "Indigenous knowledge systems are too frequently made into objects of study, treated as if they were instances of quaint folk theory held by the members of a primitive culture." Indigenous decolonization seeks a dramatic shift in the subject of academic inquiry. Rather than comparing Indigenous knowledge systems in comparison to empirical Western values, Indigenous decolonization aims to reverse this perspective so that Western funds of knowledge are subjected to due examination and study en route to restoring Indigenous knowledge, traditions, and culture.

There are specific advantages to applying Indigenous decolonization to practices and situations involving Indigenous peoples over alternative critical lenses such as critical theory, or more specifically critical race theory. According to Denzin and Lincoln, critical theory’s broad tenets of liberation and sovereignty are far too generalized for this application: "Critical theory must be localized, grounded in the specific meanings, traditions, customs, and community relations that operate in each Indigenous setting." Otherwise, a critical theory that disregards context and embraces ubiquitous characteristics of social movements cannot guide meaningful change when applied to a specific Indigenous context.

== In art ==
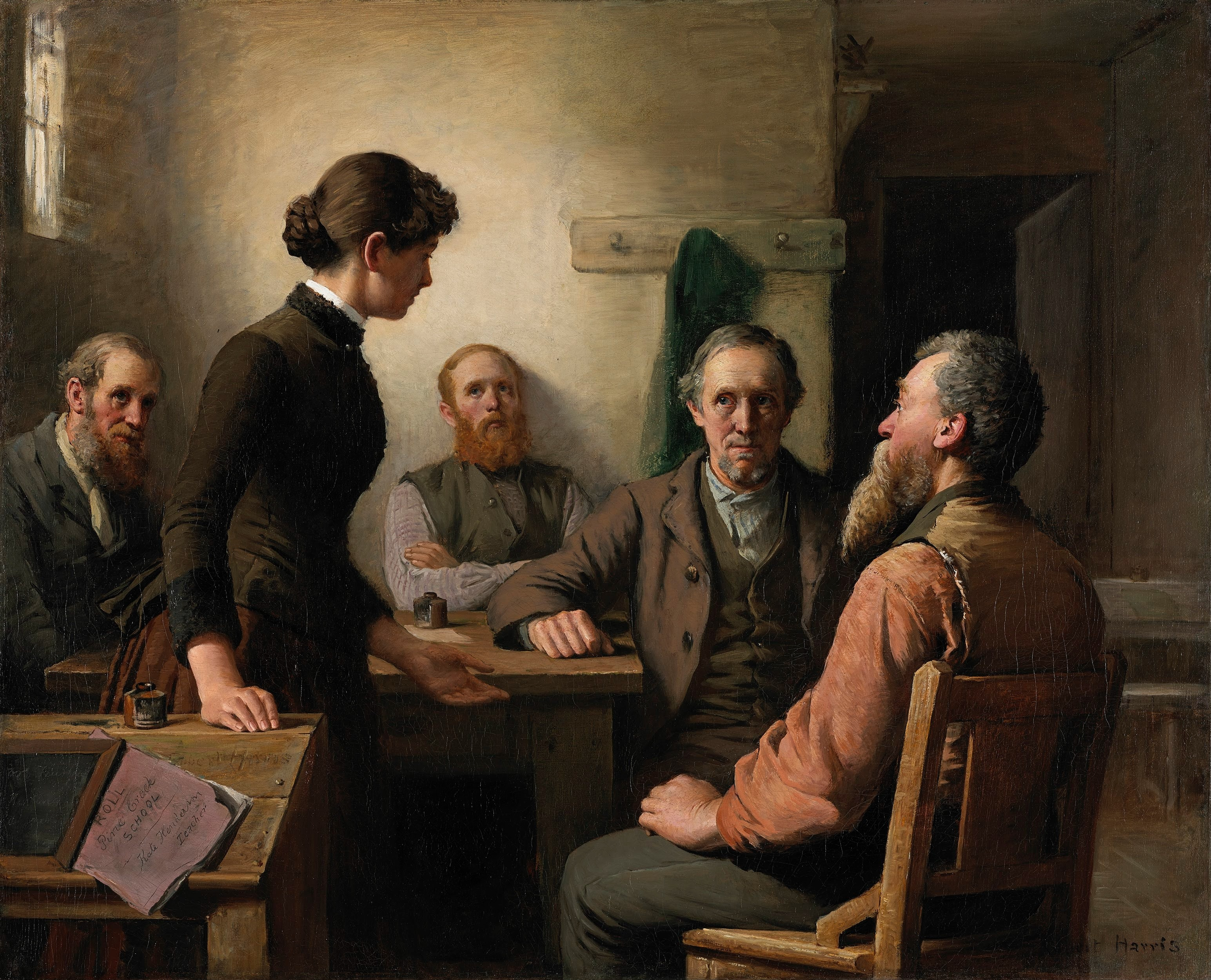
An example of a piece within the new Indigenous and Canadian Gallery at the National Art Gallery of Canada

Indigenous artists have been using art as a form of activism for many years. Jarrett Martineau and Eric Ritskes say that art forms are never separate from our political forms and "Indigenous art thus occupies a unique space within settler colonialism: both as a site for articulating Indigenous resistance and resurgence, and also as a creative praxis that often reinscribes indigeneity within aesthetic and commodity forms that circulate in the capitalist art market". Art can be used in political struggle to bring attention to important issues and to better convey the experiences of Indigenous peoples. Indigenous artists attempt to work outside of the binary of colonialism in their art. Martineau and Ritskes describe Indigenous art as "the generative expression of creativity, not the violence of colonial domination, and it is in Indigenous art's resistant motion to disavow the repetition of such violence that it recuperates the spirit of ancestral memory and place, and forges new pathways of re-emergence and return".

== See also ==
- Declaration on the Rights of Indigenous Peoples
- Decolonize This Place
- Decolonization of knowledge
- Decolonization of museums
- Human migration
- Indigenous response to colonialism
