= Ramón Grosfoguel =

Puerto Rican writer, activist and sociologist

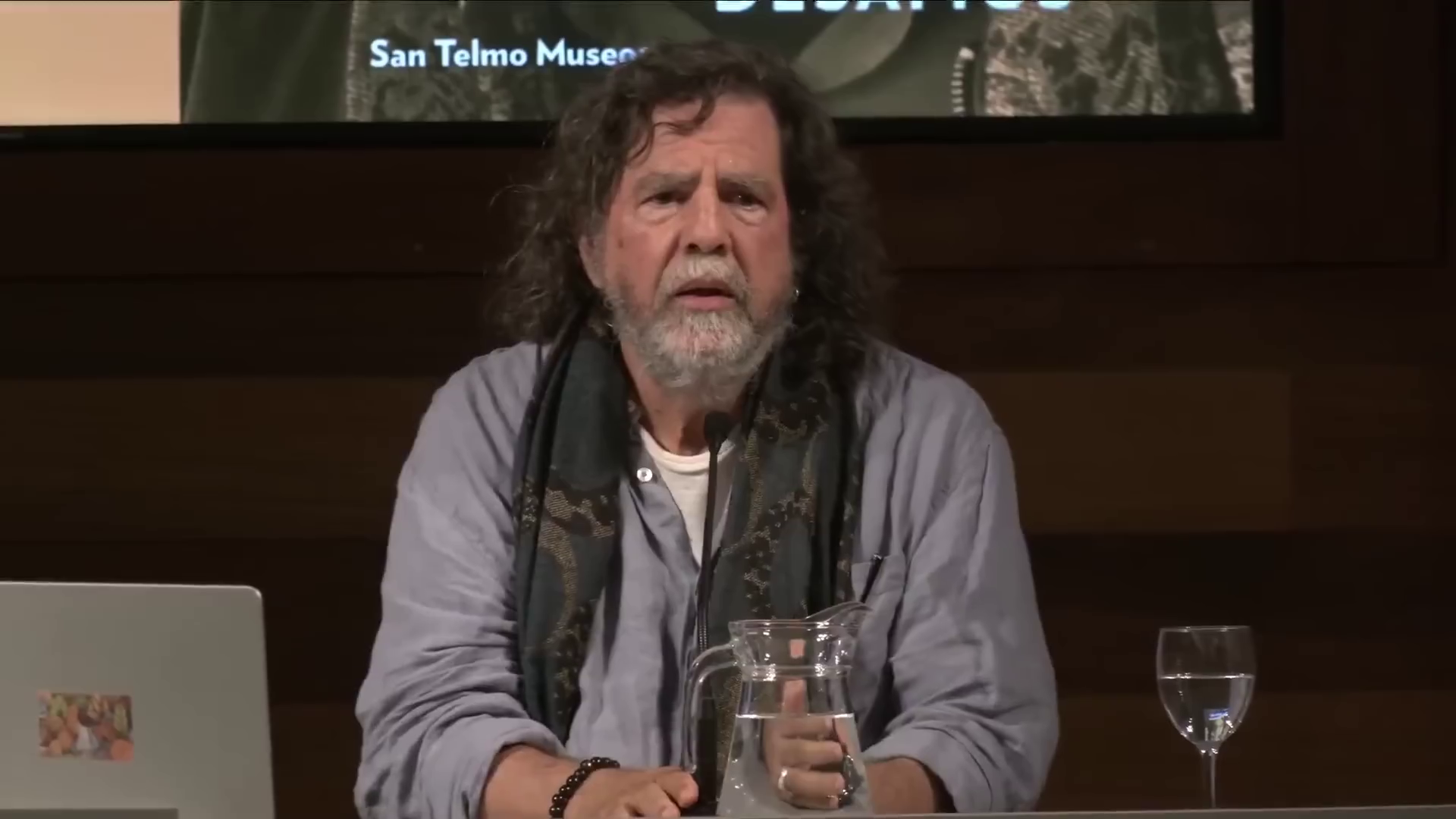
- Ramón Grosfoguel in 2025
- Born: 20 May 1956 (age 70); San Juan, Puerto Rico
- Citizenship: (United States)
- Occupations: sociologist and professor
- Writing career
- Literary movement: Modernity / Coloniality Group (Grupo M/C)

Ramón Grosfoguel (born May 20, 1956, San Juan, Puerto Rico) is a Puerto Rican sociologist who belongs to the Modernity / Coloniality Group (Grupo M/C) who is a professor emeritus of Chicano/Latino Studies in the Department of Ethnic Studies at University of California, Berkeley.

== Biography ==
=== Education ===
Ramon Grosfoguel was born in 1956 in San Juan, Puerto Rico. He obtained his bachelor's degree in Sociology at the University of Puerto Rico in 1979. He then received his master's degree in Urban Studies at Temple University in 1986, his M.A. paper being on Puerto Rico's urbanization process from 1898-1980. He also obtained a doctorate in Sociology at Temple University in 1992. The title of his doctoral dissertation was "Puerto Rico's Exceptionalism: Industrialization, Migration and Housing Development (1950 - 1970)." After receiving his doctorate, he attained two post-doctoral degrees, one of which was from the Fernand Braudel Center/Maison des Sciences de l'Homme, Paris, France (1993–94).

=== Career ===
His teaching career began in fall 1990 at Temple University as an instructor. He began teaching courses such as Race/Ethnic Relations in America, Urban Sociology, and Introduction to Sociology. Later (1992-1993), he began teaching at Johns Hopkins University as a visiting professor and was awarded the Oraculum Award for Excellence in teaching. He also taught at State University of New York Binghamton (1995 - 1998), Boston College (1998 - 2000), and the University of California Berkeley from 2001 to 2024.

== Thought ==
Ramon Grosfoguel defines his thought as belonging to the decolonial current, surpassing the postcolonial current with which it is considered related. He argues that there is a structural link between modernity and colonialism. He also argues that the effects of European colonialism did not cease with the processes of decolonization and national independence of the nineteenth and twentieth centuries, persisting in culture and ways of thinking (epistemology). It proposes a "decolonial turn" to carry out epistemological decolonization that corrects the universalist and ahistorical deformations of Eurocentrism and modernity, which it considers in a situation of "terminal crisis". It puts the accent on the critique of racism and the dividing line that colonial thought makes between the human and the non-human. It defends the idea of intersectionality of categories such as class and gender, starting from the line of distinction between the human and the non-human that colonial epistemology does.

== Works ==
- Colonial Subjects. Puerto Ricans in a Global Perspective. Berkeley: University of California Press. 2003.
- El giro decolonial: reflexiones para una diversidad epistémica más allá del capitalismo global (comp, 2007)
- Unsetling postcoloniality: coloniality, transmodernity and border thinking, Duke University Press, 2007
- "Izquierdas e Izquierdas Otras: entre el proyecto de la izquierda eurocéntrica y el proyecto transmoderno de las nuevas izquierdas descoloniales", Tabula Rasa 11 (julio-diciembre): 9-29, 2009
- "Interculturalidad ¿diálogo o monólogo?: la subalternidad desde la colonialidad del poder en los procesos fronterizos y transculturales latinoamericanos" en Mario Campaña (ed.) América Latina: los próximos 200 años (Barcelona: CECAL-Guaraguao y Ministerio de Cultura de España), 2010.
- "La descolonización del conocimiento: diálogo crítico entre la visión descolonial de Frantz Fanon y la sociología descolonial de Boaventura de Sousa Santos" en Formas-Otras: Saber, nombrar, narrar, hacer (IV Training Seminar de jóvenes investigadores en Dinámicas Interculturales, Fundación CIDOB, Barcelona): 97-108, 2011
- "Racismo Epistémico" Revista Tabula Rasa No. 14 (julio-diciembre), 2011
- "Introduction: From University to Pluriversity: A Decolonial Approach to the Present Crisis of Western Universities" (with Capucine Boidin and James Cohen), Human Architecture: Journal of the Sociology of Self-Knowledge, Vol. IX, Special Issue: 1-6, 2011.
- "Decolonizing Post-Colonial Studies and Paradigms of PoliticalEconomy: Transmodernity, Decolonial Thinking and Global Coloniality", Transmodernity: Journal of Peripheral Cultural Production of the Luso-Hispanic World Vol. 1, No. 1., 2011
- "Unsettling Eurocentrism in the Westernized University" (with Julie Cupples) Routledge, 2018

== Publications ==
- 2015 "Epistemic Racism/Sexism, Westernized Universities and the Four Genocides/Epistemicides of the Long Sixteenth Century." in Araújo, Marta and Silvia Rodríguez Maeso (Ed.): Eurocentrism, Racism and Knowledge. Debates on History and Power in Europe and the Americas. Houndmills New York. palgrave macmillan: 23–47
- 2013 "The Structure of Knowledge in Westernized Universities: Epistemic Racism/Sexism and the Four Genocides/Epistemicides of the Long 16th Century" Human Architecture: Journal of the Sociology of Self-Knowledge, Vol. 11, Article 8
- 2012 CO-EDITOR: MUSEE ET MIGRATION (co-edited with Yvon Le Bot et Alexandra Poli) forthcoming in the revue Hommes et Migration
- 2011 "La descolonización del conocimiento: diálogo crítico entre la visión descolonial de Frantz Fanon y la sociología descolonial de Boaventura de Sousa Santos" in Formas-Otras: Saber, nombrar, narrar, hacer (IV Training Seminar de jóvenes investigadores en Dinámicas Interculturales, Fundación CIDOB, Barcelona): 97-108
- 2011 "Racismo Epistémico" Revista Tabula Rasa No. 14
- 2011 Guest Editor: CONTESTING MEMORY: MUSEUMIZATIONS OF MIGRATION IN COMPARATIVE GLOBAL CONTEXT (co-edited with Yvon Le Bot, CADIS-EHESS, and Alexandra Poli, CADISEHESS) in Human Architecture: Journal of the Sociology of self-knowledge, Vol. IX, No. 4 (Fall)
- 2011 "Museum and Migration: An Introduction." Human Architecture: Journal of the Sociology of Self-Knowledge, Vol. IX, No. 4 (Fall): 1-4 2011 CO-EDITOR: DECOLONIZING THE UNIVERSITY: PRACTICING PLURIVERSITY (co-edited with Capucine Boidin, IHEAL, and James Cohen, Université de Paris III, Sorbonne-Nouvelle) in Human Architecture: Journal of the Sociology of Self-Knowledge, Vol. IX, Special Issue
- 2011 "Introduction: From University to Pluriversity: A Decolonial Approach to the Present Crisis of Western Universities" (with Capucine Boidin and James Cohen), Human Architecture: Journal of the Sociology of Self-Knowledge, Vol. IX, Special Issue: 1-6
- 2011 "The Dilemmas of Ethnic Studies in the United States: Between Liberal Multiculturalism, Identity Politics, Disciplinary Colonization, and Decolonial Epistemologies" Human Architecture: Journal of the Sociology of Self-Knowledge, Vol. IX, Special Issue: 81-90
- 2011 "Islamophobia Epistémica y Ciencias Sociales Coloniales" Revista Astrolabio (CIECS, Universidad Nacional de Córdoba), No. 6: 43-60
- 2011 "Decolonizing Post-Colonial Studies and Paradigms of PoliticalEconomy: Transmodernity, Decolonial Thinking and Global Coloniality" Transmodernity: Journal of Peripheral Cultural Production of the Luso-Hispanic World Vol. 1, No. 1
- 2010 "'Colonialidad del poder' y dinámica racial: Notas para la reinterpretación de los latinos-caribeños en Nueva York" in CIDOB Cultura política: ¿Hacia una democracia cultural? (Barcelona: CIDOB ediciones): pp. 217–244
- 2009 "Global Anti-Semitism in World-Historical Perspective: An Introduction" (with Lewis Gordon and Eric Mielants), Human Architecture: Journal of the Sociology of Self-Knowledge, Vol. VII, issue No. 2 (Spring): 1-14
- 2009 Caribbean Migration to Western Europe and the United States: Essays on Incorporation, Identity and Citizenship (co-edited with Eric Mielants and Margarita Cervantes-Rodriguez). This book compares the migration processes from the Caribbean to England, Spain, France, The Netherlands and the United States (Philadelphia: Temple University Press).
- 2008 "Latinos and the Decolonization of the US Empire in the 21st Century" Social Science Information Vol. 47 No. 4: 605-622 2008 Guest Editor (with Walter Mignolo): Intervenciones Decoloniales in Tabula Rasa (Colombia) No. 9 (julio-diciembre)
- 2008 Islamophobie dans le Monde Moderne (co-edited with Mohamed Mestiri and El Yamine Soum) This book discusses the problem of islamophobia in a world-historical perspective with a comparative analysis between several regions of the world. (Paris: IIIT FRANCE and UC-BERKELEY).
- 2007 "The Epistemic Decolonial Turn: Beyond Political-Economy Paradigms" in Cultural Studies Vol. 21, No. 2-3 (March): 211-223 2007 "Hacia un diálogo crítico-solidario con la izquierda europea". Nomada (Journal of the IESCO at the Universidad Central de Colombia) No. 26
- 2006 "Introduction: Minorities, Racism and Cultures of Scholarship" (with Eric Mielants) International Journal of Comparative Sociology 47, No. 3-4 (August): 179-189
- 2006 "Geopolitics of Knowledge and Coloniality of Power: Thinking Puerto Rico and Puerto Ricans from the Colonial Difference" in Stephen Pfohl, Aimee Van Wagenen, Patricia Arend, Abigail Brooks and Denise Leckenby (eds) Culture, Power and History: Studies in Critical Sociology (Brill: Leiden: Boston), 479-506
- 2005 "Hibridez y mestizaje: ¿sincretismo o complicidad subversiva? La subalternidad desde la colonialidad del poder" deSignis No. 6, (Octubre): 53-64
- 2005 "The Implications of Subaltern Epistemologies for Global Capitalism: Transmodernity, Border Thinking and Global Coloniality" in Richard P. Appelbaum and William I. Robinson (eds) Critical Globalization Studies (New York and London: Routledge): 283-293
- 2004 "Las implicaciones epistemológicas subalternas para el capitalismo globalizado: transmodernidad, pensamiento de frontera y colonialidad global" Del Caribe Santiago, Cuba No. 45: 64-71
- 2004 "Race and Ethnicity or Racialized Ethnicities?: Identitites within Global Coloniality" Ethnicities Vol. 4 No. 3 (September): 315-336
- 2004 "Introduction" Caribbean Studies, Vol. 32, No. 1 (January–June): vii-viii 2004 "La racialización de los migrantes coloniales del Caribe en los centros metropolitanos: Una introducción a la historia de las diversas colonialidades en cada imperio" Caribbean Studies, Vol. 32, No. 1 (January–June): 3-41
- 2003 Colonial Subjects: Puerto Ricans in a Global/Comparative PerspectiveThis book is on Puerto Rico and Puerto Rican political-economy, mass migration, and modes of incorporation to the U.S. It compares Puerto Rican migration experience with Caribbean migration to the United States and Western Europe (University of California Press).
- 2002 "Preface-Eurocentrism, Bordern Thinking, and Coloniality of Power in the Modern/colonial Capitalist World-System" REVIEW XXV, No. 3: 201-202 2002 "Colonial Difference, Geopolitics of Knowledge, and Global Coloniality in the Modern/Colonial Capitalist World-System" REVIEW XXV, No. 3: 203-224
- 2001 Migration, Transnationalization, and Race in a Changing New York. Philadelphia: Temple University Press. This is an anthology I co-edited (with Hector Cordero-Guzmán and Robert Smith).
- 2001 "Race, Ethnicity, Immigration and the Changing Political Economy of New York City" (with Robert Smith and Hector Cordero-Guzmán) in Migration, Transnationalization, and Race in a Changing New York edited by Hector Cordero-Guzmán, Ramón Grosfoguel and Robert Smith. Philadelphia: Temple University Press.
- 2000 "Miami capitale de l'Amerique Latine" LIMES (Revue Française de Geopolitique), No. 3 (eté): 22-29*
- 2000 "Developmentalism, Modernity and Dependency Theory in Latin America" NEPANTLA: Views from The South (new Journal published at Duke University) Vol. 1 No. 2: 347-374

== See also ==
- Colonialism
- Epistemology
- Global capitalism
- Human migration
- Latin American Studies Association
- Neocolonialism
- Postcolonialism

== Sources ==
- Santiago Castro-Gómez y Ramón Grosfoguel (comp.) (2007). El giro decolonial: reflexiones para una diversidad epistémica más allá del capitalismo global. Bogotá: Siglo del Hombre; Universidad Central, Instituto de Estudios Sociales Contemporáneos y Pontificia Universidad Javeriana, Instituto Pensar. ISBN 978-958-665-096-0.
- Grosfoguel, Ramón (16 December 2010). "La crisis terminal de la modernidad". YouTube. Granada: Centro de Documentación Mapuche Ñuke Mapu.
- Grosfoguel, Ramón (2011). "Curriculum" (PDF). University of California at Berkeley. Berkeley.
- Grosfoguel, Ramón (December 10, 2010). «The terminal crisis of modernity» . YouTube . Granada: Mapuche Documentation Center Ñuke Mapu . Retrieved on February 28, 2015 .
