= Sabelo J. Ndlovu-Gatsheni =

Decolonial theorist

- Born: 6 June 1968 (age 58); Gwanda, Zimbabwe

Academic background
- Education: University of Zimbabwe; University of Witwatersrand

Academic work
- Discipline: history
- Institutions: University of Bayreuth; University of South Africa; Midlands State University; University of Zimbabwe
- Main interests: epistemology

Sabelo J. Ndlovu-Gatsheni (born 6 June 1968) is a Full Professor of History and holder of Canada Research Chair (CRC) Tier 1 in Pluralistic Societies:Epistemic Pluralism and Ecologies of Knowledges at the University of Calgary in Canada. He previously held the Full Professor (W3)/Chair of Epistemologies of the Global South with Emphasis on Africa at the University of Bayreuth, Germany.

== Biography ==
Sabelo J. Ndlovu-Gatsheni is a historian, postcolonial/decolonial theorist, and public intellectual born in Gwanda, Matabeleland South in Zimbabwe.

== Education ==
Educated at the University of Zimbabwe, in Harare, and University of Witwatersrand in South Africa, Ndlovu-Gatsheni holds a BA Honours degree in history, MA in African history, PhD in history and PGDE in Tertiary Teaching/Education.

== Professional work ==
Professor Sabelo J. Ndlovu-Gatsheni began his career as a Teaching Assistant in the Department of History in 1995 at the University of Zimbabwe and he proceeded to be a lecturer in the Department of History and Development Studies at Midlands State University, located in the city of Gweru, Zimbabwe in 2000. He left Zimbabwe in 2005 to assume a new position of Lecturer in International Studies at Monash University (South Africa Campus) and in 2008 he was appointed Lecturer in African Studies based at the Ferguson Centre for Asian and African Studies at the Open University in Milton Keynes in the United Kingdom. He also worked as a Senior Researcher under the South African Foreign Policy and African Drivers (SFPAD) Programme at the South African Institute of International Affairs (SIIA) based at the University of the Witswatersrand in South Africa in 2010. In 2011 he joined the Department of Development Studies at University of South Africa (UNISA) and he worked for a decade rising to be the Director of the Archie Mafeje Research Institute for Applied Social Policy (AMRI) (2012–2015), Director for Transformation of Scholarship in the Change Management Unit (CMU) which later changed name to the Department of Leadership and Transformation (DLT) in the Principal and Vice- Chancellor's Office at UNISA in South Africa. In 2018, he became the overall Acting Executive Director of DLT spearheading the decolonization/transformation initiatives of UNISA until 2019. In 2020 he joined the University of Bayreuth in Germany as Full Professor and Chair of Epistemologies of the Global South with Emphasis on Africa. He also worked as Vice-Dean of Research in the Africa Multiple Cluster of Excellence and Director of the Bayreuth Academy of Advanced Study. Professor Ndlovu-Gatsheni has been recognized and awarded professor extraordinarius at the University of the Free State (UFS) in South Africa; honorary professor at the University of KwaZulu-Natal (UKZN) in South Africa; visiting research fellow at the University of Johannesburg in South Africa; and is also a research associate of The Ferguson Centre for African and Asian Studies at The Open University in the United Kingdom.

== Works ==
- "Beyond the Coloniality of Internationalism: Reworlding the World from the Global South" Dakar: CODESRIA Books, 2024.
- "Colonialism, Development and Knowledge in Africa: Turning Over a New Leaf" New York and London: Routledge, 2020.
- Epistemic Freedom in Africa: Deprovincialization and Decolonization New York & London: Routledge, 2018
- Empire, Global Coloniality and African SubjectivityOxford: Berghan Books, 2013
- The Decolonial Mandela: Peace, Justice and the Politics of Life Oxford: Berghahn Books, 2016
- Coloniality of Power in Postcolonial Africa: Myths of Decolonization Dakar: CODESRIA Book Series, 2013.
- "Do Zimbabweans Exist? Trajectories of Nationalism, National Identity Formation and Crisis in a Postcolonial State" Bern & Oxford: Peter Lang, 2009.
- "The Ndebele Nation: Reflections on History, Hegemony and Memory" Pretoria: UNISA Press, 2009.
