= Walter Mignolo =

Argentine semiotician and professor

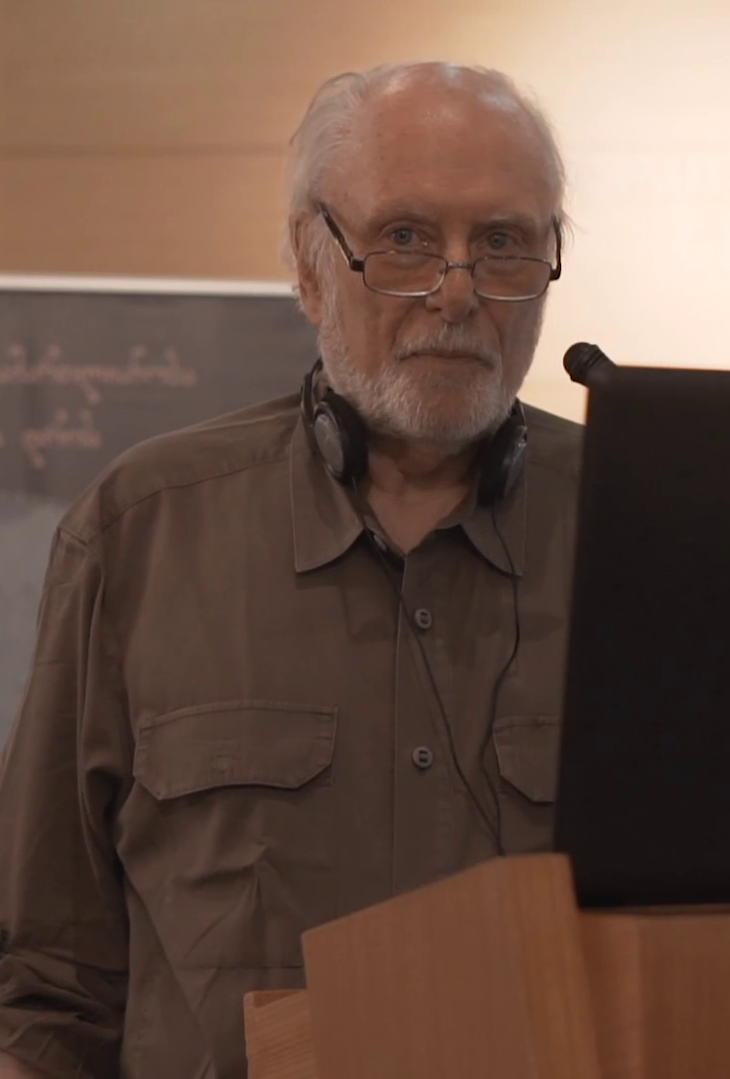
- Walter Mignolo in 2019.
- Born: Walter Mignolo; 1 May 1941 (age 85); Corral de Bustos, Argentina
- Education: School for Advanced Studies in the Social Sciences
- Occupations: Writer and professor
- Writing career
- Notable works: The Darker Side of the Renaissance: Literacy, Territoriality, Colonization (1995)

Walter D. Mignolo (born May 1, 1941) is an Argentine semiotician (School for Advanced Studies in the Social Sciences) and professor at Duke University who has published extensively on semiotics and literary theory, and worked on different aspects of the modern and colonial world, exploring concepts such as decoloniality, global coloniality, the geopolitics of knowledge, transmodernity, border thinking, and pluriversality. He is one of the founders of the modernity/coloniality critical school of thought.

== Work ==
Mignolo received his BA in Philosophy from the National University of Córdoba, Argentina in 1969. In 1974 he obtained his Ph.D. from the École des Hautes Études, Paris. He subsequently taught at the Universities of Toulouse, Indiana, and Michigan.

Since January 1993, Walter D. Mignolo has been the William H. Wannamaker Professor of Literature and Romance Studies at Duke University, USA, and has joint appointments in Cultural Anthropology and Romance Studies.

Mignolo co-edits the web dossier, Worlds and Knowledges Otherwise. He is the academic director of "Duke in the Andes", an interdisciplinary program in Latin American and Andean Studies in Quito, Ecuador, at the Politecnica Salesiana University. Since 2000, he has directed the Center for Global Studies and the Humanities, a research unit within the John Hope Franklin Center for Interdisciplinary and International Studies at Duke. He has also been named Permanent Researcher at Large at the Universidad Andina Simón Bolívar in Quito, Ecuador.

Recently, Mignolo has ventured into what he calls "decolonial aesthetics" writing on artists Pedro Lasch, Fred Wilson, and Tanja Ostojić. He contributed to Black Mirror/Espejo Negro, a book on the works of Pedro Lasch, edited by Lasch, published by Duke University Press.

== Publications ==
- 1992: The Darker Side of the Renaissance: Colonization and the Discontinuity of the Classical Tradition, Renaissance Quarterly. Vol. 45, No. 4 (Winter, 1992), pp. 808–828. The University of Chicago Press.
- 1994: Writing Without Words: Alternative Literacies in Mesoamerica and the Andes, co-edited with Elizabeth H. Boone.
- 1994-95: The Americas: Loci of Enunciations and Imaginary Constructions.
- 1995 The Darker Side of the Renaissance: Literacy, Territoriality, & Colonization, University of Michigan Press. Katherine Singer Kovács Prize from the Modern Language Association.
- 1999: Local Histories/Global Designs: Coloniality, Subaltern Knowledges and Border Thinking
- 2001: Capitalismo y Geopolitica del Conocimiento: El Eurocentrismo y La Filosofia de La Liberacion En El Debate Intelectual Contemporaneo, Coleccion Plural by Ulises Barrera and Walter Mignolo.
- 2001 "Coloniality of Power and Subalternity" in The Latin American Subaltern Studies Reader Duke University Press: Durham and London, 2001
- 2002: Vicissitudes of Theory. Contributors: Alberto Moreiras, Barbara Herrnstein Smith, Walter D. Mignolo, Slavoj Zizek, Rey Chow, Ralph A. Litzinger.
- 2003: 2nd edition: The Darker Side of the Renaissance: Literacy, Territoriality, Colonization. In Spanish: El lado más oscuro del renacimiento: alfabetización, territorialidad y colonización. http://www.unicauca.edu.co/editorial/, Popayán, Cauca
- 2003: Historias Locales / Disenos Globales: Colonialidad, Conocimientos Subalternos Y Pensamiento Fronterizo (Cuestiones De Antagonismo) 456 p., Akal Ediciones Sa.
- 2005: The Idea of Latin America, Frantz Fanon Prize for Outstanding Book in Caribbean Thoughts by The Caribbean Philosophical Association.
- 2006: Interculturalidad, descolonizacion del estado y del conocimiento/ Interculturality, Descolonization of The State and Knowledge with Catherine Walsh and Alvaro Garcia Linera. 123p.
- 2007: Cultural Studies on "Globalization and the Decolonial Option." with Arturo Escobar 21/2-3, March.
- 2007: Geopolíticas de la Animación, Marco, Centro Andalúz de Arte Contemporáneo.
- 2008: Rereading the Black Legend: The Discourses of Religious and Racial Difference in the Renaissance Empires. Margaret R. Greer, Maureen Quilligan and Walter Mignolo, Eds.
- 2009: Dispensable and Bare Lives: Coloniality and the Hidden Political/Economic Agenda of Modernity, In Historicizing Anti-Semitism, Proceedings of the International Conference on the Post-September 11 New Ethnic/Racial Configurations in Europe and the United States: The Case of Anti-Semitism Maison des Science de l'Home (MSH) Paris, June 29–30, 2007. Human Architecture: Journal of the Sociology of Self-Knowledge: Vol. 7: Iss. 2, Article 7.
- 2011: The Darker Side of Western Modernity: Global Futures, Decolonial Options (Latin America Otherwise). Duke University Press Books, 458 p.
- 2018: On Decoloniality: Concept, Analytics, Praxis co-authored with Catherine Walsh. Duke University Press
- 2021: The Politics of Decolonial Investigations (On Decoloniality). Duke University Press
