= Civil discourse =

Civic deliberation over public affairs issues

Civil discourse is the practice of deliberating about matters of public concern with others in a way that seeks to expand knowledge and promote understanding. The word "civil" relates directly to civic in the sense of being oriented toward public life, and less directly to civility, in the sense of mere politeness. Discourse is defined as the use of written or spoken communications, similar to having a conversation. Civil discourse includes the practice of deliberating about things that are of concern to society in a way that seeks to help all participants understand each other. It is an essential part of democratic citizenship and is thus a fundamental aspect of freedom of speech, characterized by dialogue that supports the societal good." For civil discourse to truly be effective as a democratic tool, all people need to be heard and share their viewpoints. Civil discourse involves more than just politeness; it involves disagreement without disrespect, seeking common ground, listening beyond preconceptions, and remaining present in dialogues despite deep disagreements. This can help develop better public policies that benefit all people of a society. Members of the U.S. Supreme Court session in 2011 aptly described civil discourse as "robust, honest, frank and constructive dialogue and deliberation that seeks to advance the public interest." Viewpoints are grounded in reason and evidence, adhering to strict guidelines for the appropriate behavior to be practiced. In contrast, uncivil discourse contains direct insults, unwarranted attributions of motive, and open contempt." Civil discourse has its foundation on several key values:

- Self-awareness and mindfulness
- Practices such as active listening, being present, and interrogating one's identity markers
- Mindfulness practices (this help individuals remain peaceful and open during discussions, enhancing their ability to engage respectfully and constructively.)

One common misconception about civil discourse is that it necessitates the avoidance of conflicts. Some erroneously equate civil communication with excessive politeness. However, civil discourse does not demand people-pleasing; rather, it encourages effective discussion over disagreements. In this way, individuals with differing opinions can embrace conflicts to objectively understand a subject.^{[14]} Effective civil discourse involves critical engagement and honest feedback, which can sometimes be challenging but is essential for growth and understanding. However, individuals engaging in civil discourse should avoid debating, responding with retorts or attacks, and be willing to stand their ground respectfully.

Civil discourse is an aspect of democratic citizenship that forums and Universities are expected to promote. Forums and universities are expected to create an environment where ideas can be exchanged and discussed openly, supported by the concepts of sharing ideas, freedom to learn, and encouraging analytic thinking. These institutions can enjoy the rights and protections they do because it is understood that they are essential to promote learning, knowledge expansion, and freedom of information. The implementation of civil discourse in educational settings, particularly in online and hybrid learning environments, has been shown to enhance students' ability to engage in meaningful and respectful discussions on controversial topics. highlights how structured online discussion threads, supported by clear rubrics and continuous feedback, can foster a deeper understanding and application of civil discourse among graduate students. Libraries stimulate civil discourse engagement through the concept of freedom of information by serving the community access to information regardless of the socioeconomic status and with this covering population that may not have university access.

Civil discourse requires maturity of individuals, and capability to be rational and autonomous in thinking. It requires that individuals can critically analyze their own predisposed values and beliefs which may be influencing them against society's good. Engaging in civil discourse broadens one's intellectual scope, considers and reflects upon the views of others in society, and integrates those ideas when an individual recognizes the benefits. It is the responsibility of all members of society to actively participate in productive and respectful discourse, as this practice dismantles the rigidity of oppression and fosters a mental space where society's true nature and potential can be recognized.

Within countries which value and uphold freedom of speech, civil discourse is believed to enhance objectives and ideas. However, in many other countries it may be valued to varying degrees. Primarily in democratic nations, civil discourse is necessary and encouraged. The sharing and integration of ideas from all citizens allows for implementation of policies that enact the most favorable outcomes for the most people. In other nations, specifically those where democracy is not practiced, civil discourse is still valuable and necessary for discussion and reasoning through societal issues that are decided within communities. Historically, we see consequences of intolerance and failures of civil discourse within authoritarian governments such as Nazi Germany, the Soviet Union, or Maoist China. In these societies civil discourse was heavily discouraged including by violence, torture, or excommunication. Within the United States during McCarthyism there was a lack of open debate regarding topics which were taboo at the time such as Communism and homosexuality.

Some challenges to civil discourse include epistemic injustice, intolerance, and censorship. Epistemic injustice relates to the "distributive unfairness in respect of epistemic goods such as information or education" as described by Miranda Fricker. Not all facts are distributed equally, and with the introduction of targeted advertisements and algorithmic matching of information to consumers on most social media platforms, this issue is exacerbated. Additionally, intolerance of ideas threatens civil discourse as it has led to unreasonable attacks on the moral character of individuals, causing hesitancy to openly share ideas. Herbert Marcuse argues that complete tolerance is serving oppression, as it requires tolerance of even oppressive ideas, which is effectively tolerance of censorship. Censorship is forcible suppression of opposition, which is a component of authoritarianism and also threatens public discourse, and the decisions of most free societies, as it skews an individual's perception of the societal climate toward a bias that is not representative of the actual feelings of a society. However, if the censorship is kept in a microcensorship form, then it has the ability to escape the pitfalls of the macrocensorship described above. To further elaborate, microcensorship is more of a localized censorship – one that gets imposed in a smaller form and often comes from an institution such as a library, local bookstore, or some other small group of individuals.

The necessity to practice civil discourse has grown over the years as digital engagement has become a predominant means of communication, technology has created a more global environment and increased self-expression. Various studies have adopted uses for applying civil discourse to their methods and similar guidelines can be referenced, such as civil discourse in government, ethics, science, or education. Different ways of practicing or understanding civil discourse can be in self-expression (art), the use of tolerance as intolerance (ethics), misinformation and disinformation (digital communication), and in political and social issues.

== Definition ==
The definition of civil, in civil discourse, in context refers to being civic or relating to public life.

The definition of discourse according to linguistics expert Rukya Hassen, from Wollo University in Ethiopia, says it's a way to debate or discuss "aspects of the world." She divides discourse into three applications:

1. Discussion about the processes, relations, and structures of the material world.
2. Discussion about the thoughts, feelings, and beliefs of the mental world.
3. Discussion about the social world.

According to Hassen, "discourse has become both the means and the end of knowledge and its transmission."

Through these definitions, civil discourse is the practice of debating important matters in a way that considers public life.

== History ==
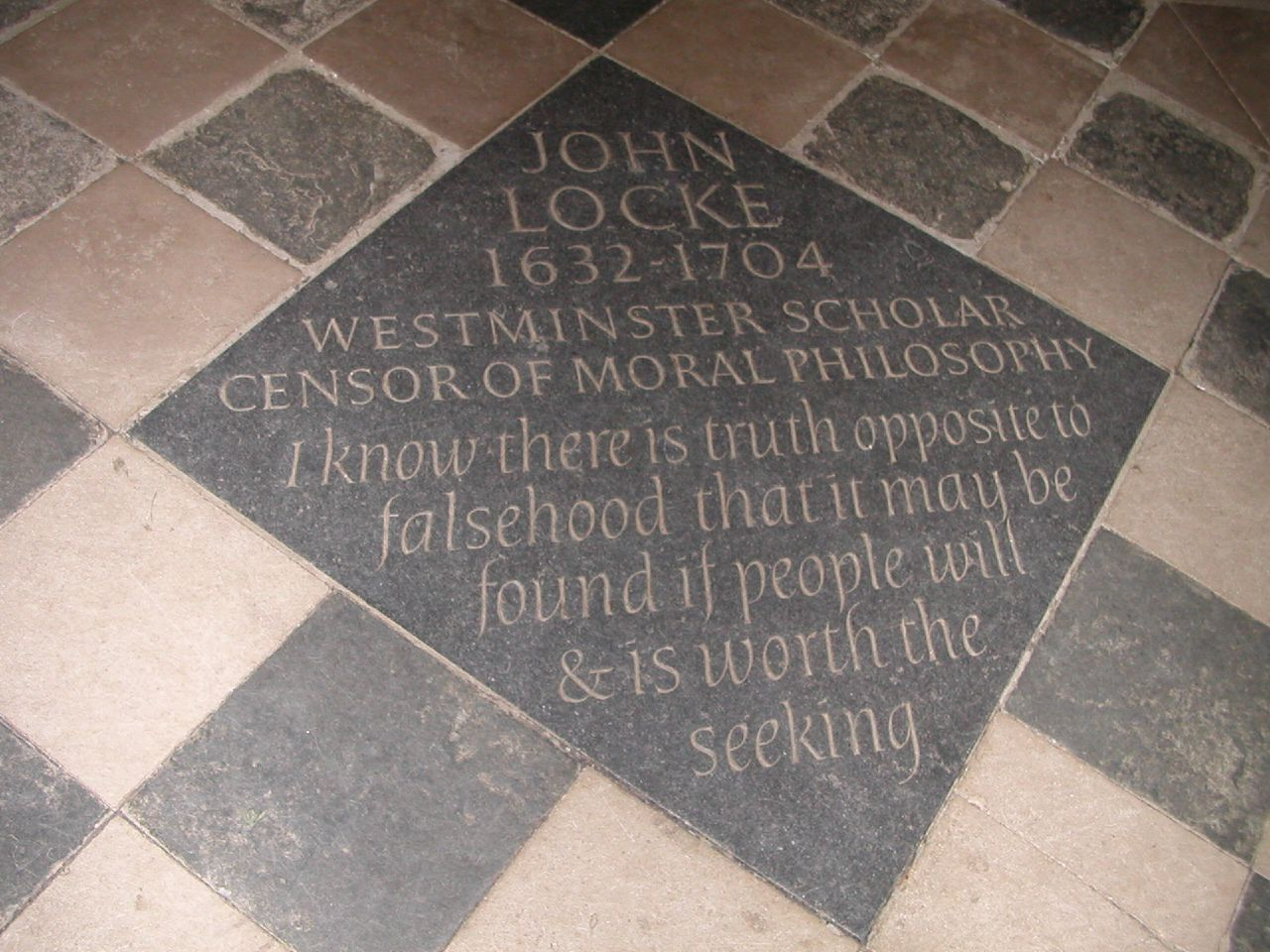
The memorial stone of John Locke in Christ Church, Oxford.

=== Early years ===
In Book III of An Essay Concerning Human Understanding (1690), philosopher John Locke contrasts between civil and philosophical discourse (or rhetorical discourse) emphasizing the importance of communication for public good. public good: Locke's ideas laid the groundwork for understanding civil discourse as a tool for societal benefit.

First, by, their civil use, I mean such a communication of thoughts and ideas by words, as may serve for the upholding common conversation and commerce, about the ordinary affairs and conveniences of civil life, in the societies of men, one amongst another. Secondly, by the philosophical use of words, I mean such a use of them as may serve to convey the precise notions of things and to express in general propositions certain and undoubted truths, which the mind may rest upon and be satisfied within its search after true knowledge. These two uses are very distinct; and a great deal less exactness will serve in the one than in the other, as we shall see in what follows.

One of the most influential works on civil discourse comes from John Stuart Mill in their 1859 essay titled "On Liberty". In the defense of the freedom of expression, Mill wrote "If all of mankind minus one were of one opinion, and only one person were of the contrary opinion, mankind would be no more justified in silencing that one person than he, if he had the power, would be justified in silencing mankind." Mill argued that allowing individuals to freely express unpopular or dissenting opinions is crucial to progressing society. Mill introduced the concept of the "marketplace of ideas" which suggests that free and open debate allows for the best ideas to be used while discrediting harmful ideas. He believed that suppressing dissenting viewpoints stifles moral progress. This is a utilitarianism argument against censorship and simultaneously for intellectual freedom. Mill argues that getting down to the truth typically increases overall happiness because the truth is what most individuals are seeking. With this in mind, a utilitarian should support minimal-to-nonexistent censorship because its natural increase of overall happiness is the end goal and a direct result.

=== 19th Century ===
John Stuart Mill's 1859 essay On Liberty is a cornerstone in the history of civil discourse. Mill argued for the freedom of expression, positing that open debate is essential for societal progress. His concept of the "marketplace of ideas" suggests that free and open debate allows the best ideas to prevail. Mill argues that free thought and speech are important for the acquisition of true beliefs and for individual growth and development. Similarly, in "On Liberty," Mill asserts that all ideas, even those considered false or unpopular, should be freely discussed and debated. This is because truth is often discovered through the clash of differing ideas and opinions. In short, Mill's argument hinges on the idea that determination of truth among ideas by civil discourse is necessary for moving society forward, and that free speech is necessary for the mechanism of civil discourse to properly function.

In the digital age, civil discourse faces new challenges and opportunities. Social media platforms have expanded the potential for interaction but also introduced issues like cyberbullying and misinformation. Initiatives like Stanford University's AI chatbot moderator aim to promote civil discourse online by moderating discussions and reducing hostility.

=== 20th Century ===
Philosopher Marshall McLuhan1964 work Understanding Media: The Extensions of Man explored how communication channels influence discourse. Understanding Media: The Extensions of Man (1964). The title of this chapter, The Medium is the Message His famous phrase "The medium is the message" predicted the impact of the internet on civil discourse.. This exploration is widely understood to be a great predictor of the internet today, and how discourse on the internet works. The main idea of this work is that those channels by which people communicate are just as important as the content of the discourse itself.

=== The 21st Century ===
In 2001, social psychologist Kenneth J. Gergen described civil discourse as the "language of dispassionate objectivity", and suggested that it requires respect of the other participants, such as the reader. It neither diminishes the others' moral worth, nor questions their good judgment; it avoids hostility, direct antagonism, or excessive persuasion; it requires modesty and an appreciation for the other participant's experiences.

A 2011 assessment of civil discourse from Bob Stein, quoted in an article by Maria Bustillos, echoed Locke's statements, and highlighted civil discourse's usefulness in the Internet age: "'The truth of a discipline, idea or episode in history lies in these interstices,' he said. 'If you want to understand something complicated it's helpful to look at the back and forth of competing voices or views.'"

The Charles Koch Institute stated in 2018 that "Democracy presupposes that citizens are deeply engaged in the debates of our public life, and that good outcomes are reached by the airing of all arguments on the policy questions of the day, with the presumption that the most persuasive and well-reasoned will earn the support of a majority of voters."

According to American University's Project on Civil Discourse in 2018, civil discourse is not purely performative or mere politeness, not an exercise in martyrdom or telling other people who they are; instead, it is truthful and productive, based on engaging with one's audience through both listening and talking, and it is each speaker's own responsibility to engage in civil discourse.

In April 2022, nursing educators Emily Gamm and Amy J. Barton said that "Civility generally involves behaviors such as looking for areas of agreement as a jumping off point for discussions about differences, listening beyond one's biases, and encouraging others to do the same".

=== In the Information Age ===
For centuries, issues of civil discourse only arose concerning oral communication. Both printing and the internet have dramatically changed civil discourse. The evolution of this dramatic change is captured in John Perry Barlow's paper "A Declaration of the Independence of Cyberspace" where he describes the internet being its own country, being a place where people act freely according to their own rules and ethical framework, this is relevant within the civil discourse topic as the discussion on how the internet should be controlled and who makes the rules of it impacts the exchange of ideas between individuals. As described by John Budd, discourse analysis includes not merely what is said but also how it is said. It is harder to discern the true meaning or feeling behind what is said when there is no person to accompany the words. In the Information Age, social media and online information and communications technology have dramatically expanded the potential for human interaction. According to philosopher Marshall McLuhan, these new tools make up the first significant shift in human communication since the printing press. Where the printing press enabled "the ownership of an idea", the Digital Revolution led to the devaluation of the expert and the empowering of collaboration. In fact, the public shifted from being passive receivers to active collaborators. There has been a shift towards public reasoning. An example of this is the popular use of Wikipedia. Thus, knowledge in the Information Age is defined by crowdsourcing and argument.

Yet social media and online information and communications technology generate significant challenges for institutional policies and practices to encourage and sustain civil discourse for critical social and personal issues. Journalist Alexander Heffner of PBS's The Open Mind has expressed concerns about "increasing divisiveness in American discourse" and has lectured on "Civil Discourse in an Uncivil Age". The National Institute for Civil Discourse has cited criticisms that uncivil interactions are common in text-based online communication. In his book The Cult of the Amateur: How Today's Internet Is Killing Our Culture, Andrew Keen argues that the democratization of the Internet "is not improving the community; it is not developing rich conversations; and it is not building collaboration" but rather has led to the development of "digital narcissism", or the embrace of the self, which is counterproductive to citizenship. Focusing on oneself is not listening, reading, and ingesting high-quality information, which are key elements to citizenship. Keen also argues that the internet's anonymity leads to uncivil conversations online. With that said, online anonymity does lend its own set of pros and cons to civil discourse. On the benefits side, there is a boost with online anonymity so individuals can freely express their opinions without fear of repercussion by sense of security due to the protection of their privacy.For example, individuals who may face discrimination from their immediate community should openly take a particular stance to find it possible to join the conversation through online anonymity. By conducting their narrative in such a manner, the aforementioned individual may find it possible to connect with others in similar situations and promote beneficial change within their community.

On the cons side of online anonymity, Reynol Junco and Arthur Chickering mention in their article Civil Discourse in the Age of Social Media that there are many challenges to discourse online, such as cyberbullying. Misinformation is another huge offender on the cons side, for example, the U.S. and many nations needed a strategy to attack the misinformation and disinformation during the COVID-19 pandemic. Academic institutions should focus on responsible social media discourse as communication trends towards increasing digital communication. They outline eight guidelines for academia to follow when teaching appropriate civil discourse through technology:

(1) make a formal institutional commitment to supporting institutional pluralism; (2) recognize the educational value of open sharing and examination of diverse views; (3) recognize that online forms of expression are as important to student development as traditional oral and written expressions; (4) emphasize the importance of respect and civility; (5) emphasize the critical need for valid information, solid evidence and explicit information about sources; (6) spell out expected positive behaviors and sanctions for negative actions; (7) requires that personal identification be part of all communications and interactions; and (8) designate a clear locus of responsibility for monitoring online communications and interactions and for the strengthening of the educational uses of these emerging communication and technologies.

While technologies are conducive to public discourse, they can also allow for uncivil and detrimental discourse. Stanford University conducted one example how new technologies affect the pursuit of civil disclosure. Stanford researchers used artificial intelligence to develop a chatbot moderator to promote civil, civic discourse on its online deliberation platform. Furthermore, technologies made available in the information age, such as artificial intelligence and machine learning, have been deployed in initiatives to improve civil discourse in areas such as politics. The Civil Discourse Project, a non-partisan group developing software that rates political leaders on civility, combines crowdsourcing and artificial intelligence to flag divisive language amongst political candidates. They understand that technology has played a role in creating divisiveness but can also be used to "...promote constructive dialogue, not centrism".

People need to have the ability to exchange ideas. "On every continent, through countless experiments and projects, teachers, social activists, researchers, community organizers, and concerned technologists are writing their own rules. These people are working to establish an information and communication infrastructure that is in marked contrast to that desired by the dot-coms and the technolibertarians—-an infrastructure that truly meets the disparate and critical needs of the world's citizenry."

Civil discourse is not about yelling one another to establish dominance on one's position whether it is in person or online but it is also not about agreeing on everything or saying what the other wants to hear. Civil discourse can present in different ways, typically a debate will take place between the positions being discussed, one supports and the other argues with relevant evidence and maintaining the respect to one another. Deliberation is another way it can present itself where the individuals analyze the benefit of different choices but still goes back to the core principle of civil discourse, inviting people to dialogue.:

In a 2016 HBR blog post, Shane Greenstein and Feng Zhu said that Wikipedia is a platform that invites a civil discourse by allowing contributions from the public on just about any topic in a civil manner:

Wikipedia has a remarkable record of bringing confronting opinions into the same conversation without it descending into hate speech and loutish behavior. Participation may be cheap to assemble online, but it works better at Wikipedia because the site has a widely publicized set of norms and principles, which editors attempt to enforce within a framework that assumes goodwill.

As free exchange of ideas lays at the forefront of the defining necessities for civil discourse, online platforms must allow for a digital marketplace of ideas. Yet online social media and discussion formats may not always provide effective means for civil discourse, as research suggests that it is much easier to be dismissive of opposing or new ideas in an online format of discourse as opposed to traditional face-to-face methods. One thing that needs to be emphasized is that online platforms, such as social media and websites, play a massive role in civil disclosure. Online platforms propagate discourse of all formats as sharing is the nature of the internet, yet maintaining the civil nature of such discussion becomes increasingly difficult in the digital sphere. "Just as reasoning supports an assertion, evidence supports reasoning. There are many different kinds of evidence, ranging from expert testimony or statistics to historical or contemporary examples. A lack of these fundamental reasoning skills can worsen an already anonymous and detached argument. Online platforms encourage a new structure of learning and communication, Learning in the past was sitting in lecture halls and having 'traditional' face-to-face discussions, but today, the online platform encourages any means to communicate online. Online communication through these platforms, sending emails and text messages, is just as effective as having 'traditional' face-to-face discussions. It also allows the accessibility to communicate anywhere in the world through a network connection. "Knowledge and information are growing more broadly and immediately participatory and collaborative by the moment". The amount of information accessibility to any online user is endless, as Marshall McLuhan calls it, "a galaxy for sight".

Neutral information can help viewers grasp other viewpoints and the underlying mechanisms, inspiring people to engage in healthy civic conversation. Web search engine algorithms promote the news "filter bubble" because they present personalized results of polarized topics such that the top results are biased towards a user's existing beliefs. A 2018 study from Northeastern University showed that Google search engine results about Donald Trump following the 2016 inauguration were significantly more biased when a user was logged into their Google account (and therefore provided personal information about the user's existing beliefs) than non-personalized search results. Consequently, search engines can influence political opinion and even election outcomes. This bias in search engine and social media algorithms can hinder civil discourse because civil discourse is fundamentally about understanding multiple perspectives, and a person cannot attempt to understand an opposing idea if they are never exposed to it. With the limitations caused by search engine algorithms, people have the potential to become more polarized and divisive, and unable or unwilling to engage in civil discourse. The order in which search engine results are presented is highly influential, because the top three results receive over 50% of clicks, and results on the first results page receive 75% of clicks.

Furthermore, people generally have a high level of trust in Google and other search engines and are often unaware they receive biased search results, making personalized results through search engine optimization incredibly impactful on civil discourse with unreadily apparent effects. Additionally, 62% of adults get news through social media; however, only 18% of adults say they do so often. Many Facebook news sources are biased across six metrics: political affiliation, age, gender, income level, racial affinity, and national identity. While political association is the most apparent, bias is also quantifiable across the other metrics. Twitter news search results were found to be biased based on input data and ranking system. The results, however, were not found to become increasingly polarized, but were found to be biased contingent on the query keywords and time of day the search happened. Additionally, the Twitter news search results were less favorable towards political candidates than those found in an equivalent Google search, as the Google top results often contain candidate controlled web pages.

In addition, since Artificial Intelligence (AI) is progressing within information technology and social media, civil discourse must be maintained by ensuring these systems are accurately representing all communities and retain no bias. One of today's issues is that AI can receive the bias of its creators and cause some communities and diversities to be misrepresented. Moreover, to ensure AI is centered around civil discourse, significant amounts of data, algorithms and systems must “…be adapted and adjusted regularly to remain relevant and representative". AI could also be a key factor in upholding civil discourse in education, politics or even used as a useful tool. AI could be used to remove "noise" that prevents civil discourse from reaching its full potential and ensures all voices are heard. AI is meant to mimic human language. Previously, when a person would obtain information from a search engine they had some understanding that a computer was ranking and producing the best results based on the search terms. Now, when people query AI, they are beginning to think of the responses in the same way as getting information from another person rather than a search engine. Chatting with AI can feel like civil discourse to the end user. This could be a problem moving forward. People were already moving more and more interactions online with the advent of social media. This can create filter bubbles and lead to confirmation bias. The same problem can arise with the use of AI if the user isn't aware of how AI works or that a user's own queries can bias the responses. Users must be reminded that AI is a tool to improve efficiency in research and learning, currently we are seeing the short terms benefits but in the long term, a risk being noted is users not developing their analytic and decision making thinking due to the constant use of chatbots like ChatGPT. An example of how AI can support civil discourse would be the experiment published in the article "Leveraging AI for democratic discourse: Chat interventions can improve online political conversation at scale" shows how AI can improve online conversation on highly controversial-polarized topics with AI intervention rephrasing messages to tone them down to a more polite and empathetic message.

== Importance ==
Civil discourse embodies the values of civic learning: open-mindedness, compromise, and mutual respect. In a way, civil discourse promotes individual and social development. It can be challenging and fruitful. Civil discourse is the practice of engaging in conversation to seek and foster understanding with mutual airing of views. It is not a contest; rather, it is intended to promote mutual understanding. It involves all parties' commitment to respect for truth, a practice of active listening and purposeful speaking, and an understanding that the cultivation of civil discourse is not a right but a responsibility. When properly executed, those involved can communicate alternative views, opinions, ideas, or facts without causing emotional distress or an altercation between individuals. Participants in civil discourse must learn about all sides of the issue at hand by respectfully listening to alternative interpretations, critically weighing the information's veracity, analyzing what they've heard, and being willing to alter their positions based on a convincing argument and evidence. As individuals, civil discourse enables people to preserve their relationships with our friends, families, and neighbors, ensuring that they have robust ties across points of difference.

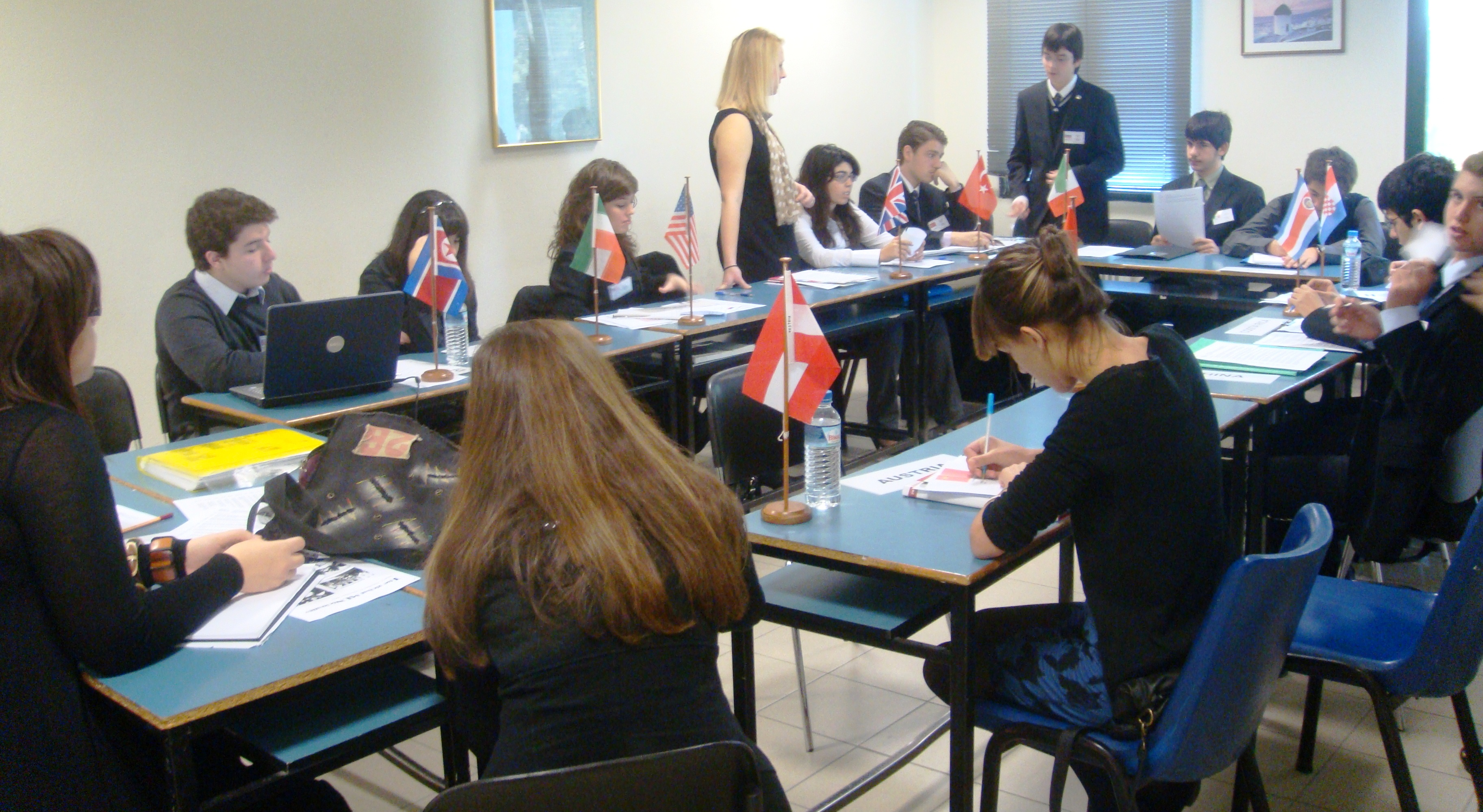
Model United Nations, like this one in Thessaloniki, Greece, allows students to explore viewpoints different from their own and engage in civil discourse surrounding human rights.

In her book Epistemic Injustice: Power and the Ethics of Knowing, philosopher Miranda Fricker has stated:

”Open dialogue is necessary for the recognition of epistemic injustice and for the development of a more just epistemic culture. It is only through respectful and open communication that we can create spaces in which people can share their ideas and perspectives without fear of being marginalized or silenced".

Fricker argued that to handle discussions of topics often associated with civil discourse people should frame the discourse as first-order ethical questions focused on socially situated conception. This is meant to cause civil discourse to focus on the social aspects of the situation and those participating in the conversation, by focusing on questions of power structure with first-order ethical questions while also acknowledging the multiple aspects of social situations and their impact. It is the duty of the persons involved in the discourse to be mindful of their position as both a listener and a speaker and acknowledge issues with power structure should they arise.

According to an article by the Charles Koch Institute, civil discourse is not meant to be an attempt to control or limit other's free speech, but rather an attempt to effectively communicate with others and understand various points of view. It is a vital tool that can enable individuals to maintain relationships with others, even if they have a different point of view regarding certain issues. Moreover, effective civil discourse focuses on the points that people agree upon, which in turn allows for better communication and effective arguments. They end the article with the statement:

Civil discourse is conversation with a serious purpose. It is conversation that looks to find shared opportunity, not conflict. It is conversation that looks to remove barriers, not build new ones. It is a conversation that instead of becoming paralyzed by our disagreements, uses them to propel creative solutions and alternatives.

Civil discourse opens wider possibilities, deepens one's knowledge, adds another layer of authority to the works, helps inspire others, and is the first step to making them a reality. According to the Journal of Higher Education Outreach and Engagement, polite civil discourse can improve comprehension of a subject, which can foster both academic and personal progress. Maria Bustillos puts forth that disagreements don't necessarily need to be battles, but instead should be embraced and savored as an opportunity to grow.

Civil discourse is essential in facilitating dialogue between nations in order to resolve conflicts. The United Nations is a prime example of this as civil discourse in the UN allows for all voices and concerns to be heard before moving on to negotiations. Not only is civil discourse essential for conflict resolution, but also it is important in agreeing upon international policies dealing with issues such as basic human rights, global issues such as climate change, and various other international policies such as basic health issues and what are considered to be war crimes.

== Guidelines ==
In order to have a successful civil discourse, there are some guidelines that each participant should follow. First, participants have to remain respectful and calm even when confronted with ideas or views that they disagree with. To make a point or defend a position in a civil discussion, you would employ logic, persuasion, proof, knowledge, and reasoning, but you would not personally attack the opposing party. It is important to separate egos and ideas. A lot of individuals feel threatened when their ideas are challenged, which impacts the discourse. Keeping a logical frame is very valuable in these situations. As mentioned by the Administrative Office of the U.S. Courts, separating facts and opinions will result in a more constructive discussion. While both are valid, they have to be expressed appropriately.

Proponents of civil discourse have proposed loosely defined "rules" to be followed. Andrea Leskes, writing in Liberal Education in 2013, gave a list of such rules, such as listening thoughtfully to what others say, seeking to understand the sources of disagreement and common ground, coming into the discussion willing to compromise, using verified information to support one's argument, and refraining from violence. More specifically, to partake in civil discourse effectively, Leskes suggests the following practices:

- undertake a serious exchange of views;
- focus on the issues rather than on the individual(s) espousing them;
- defend their interpretations using verified information;
- thoughtfully listen to what others say;
- seek the sources of disagreements and points of common purpose;
- embody open-mindedness and a willingness change their minds;
- assume they will need to compromise and are willing to do so;
- treat the ideas of others with respect
- avoid violence (physical, emotional, and verbal).

However, as noted by Kirby Jarod, at times it is impossible to remain stoic during such debates as our responses are largely emotion based. Such responses can lead to divides and further conflict among parties rather than any form of resolution. Therefore, scholars have asserted the idea that empathy plays a critical role in civil discourse as it allows for interpersonal relationships to be established.

Some common guidelines to facilitate civil discourse summarized by the University of Michigan include identifying a clear purpose, establishing ground rules, providing a common basis for understanding, creating a framework for discussion that maintains focus and flow, including everyone, and summarizing discussion and gathering feedback.

The Center for Ethics and Human Values at Ohio State University offers a free online course on the 4C's of civil discourse; be curious, be charitable, be conscientious and be constructive. "This course will help you build civic trust through improved mutual understanding and shared problem-solving, even when you disagree strongly on contentious social and political issues."

The Better Arguments Project, a national initiative committed to the civil discourse necessary to overcome social divides, shares five principles of a better argument:

1. Take winning off the table: be open to exchanging ideas and understanding a different perspective rather than focusing on winning an argument.

2. Prioritize relationships and listen passionately: listen to understand other's points of view rather than waiting for an opportunity to advance your argument. Build a relationship beyond one's opinion and be willing to share things about yourself in return.

3. Pay attention to context: understand that factors such as life experience, culture, and access to information influence one's beliefs and allow those factors to inform your perspective of their point of view.

4. Embrace vulnerability: be willing to grow by considering an alternative perspective.

5. Make room to transform: remove the focus from winning an argument and be amenable to different perspectives.

=== In courtrooms ===
"In courtrooms, it's not the loudest voice that prevails."

The United States Court system has listed ground rules that can be used to develop one's code of civil discourse.

1. Be mindful of your own behavior. Pay attention to how you react when others speak. Your words and your silence can impact others in the group.
2. Wait to be recognized by the moderator before you speak. You can use the time to reflect on what has already been said.
3. Don't interrupt or talk over someone else that is speaking.
4. No side conversations as they are disrespectful to the speaker and distract others that are listening.
5. Listen for the content in the statements of others, most importantly if you disagree. What are the speakers trying to communicate?
6. Find common ground. What do you agree on?
7. Follow the direction of the discussion. Don't repeat what has been said already.
8. Ask questions to understand perspectives that are different from your own.
9. Don't embarrass yourself or disrespect others by making demeaning comments, gestures or facial expressions.
10. Know the difference between fact and opinion. Both can be valid.

The U.S. federal judiciary has compiled information on creating ground rules for civil discourse, including how to interact respectfully with someone who has broken the rules of civility that were agreed upon. As Judge Robin Rosenberg of the U.S. District Court, West Palm Beach, Florida said, "Civility is a way of communicating with one another, it is the foundation by which we relate to one another, and from that, everything else flows."

Engagement in Civil Discourse Rules

According to the United States Court Ground Rules in Civil Discourse:

1. Tell the truth, the whole truth, and nothing but the truth.

2. Moderate your tone, so that you don’t sound aggressive.

3. Be conscious and mindful of your facial expressions.

4. Be attentive and considerate of your opponent’s point of view; Process what is being said and give equal time to opposing opinions.

5. Don’t repeat yourself. Use a variety of evidence.

It also provides a way to interact respectfully with those who don't follow the civility rules as follows:

1. Respectfully ask for evidence that supports the statements made.

2. Stay calm and consider taking a break from the conversation.

3. Tell your opponent that you don’t know how to interpret his/her facial expression.

4. Ask for help in understanding what they mean.

5. Ask for equal time, using a polite tone: "May I finish my point?”

6. Express understanding: "I understand", or "I hear you."

According to the Institute for Civility in Government,

Civility is about more than just politeness, although politeness is a necessary first step. Being polite means trying to smooth over potentially points of conflict, facilitating life in our social world. It is about disagreeing without disrespect, seeking common ground as a starting point for dialogue about differences, listening past one's preconceptions, and teaching others to do the same. Civility is the hard work of staying present even with those with whom we have deep-rooted and fierce disagreements. It is political in the sense that it is a necessary prerequisite for civic action. But it is political, too, in the sense that it is about negotiating interpersonal power such that everyone's voice is heard, and nobody's is ignored.

=== In classrooms ===
Civil discourse in contemporary educational settings is essential for an inclusive, intellectual, and stimulating learning environment. When engaging in civil discourse, it useful to set the stage through a safe and reflective environment. Encouraging active listening, empathetic understanding, and critical thinking, civil discourse promotes an environment that fosters respectful and constructive exchanges among students and instructors, bringing together diverse ideas and perspectives. Instructors help facilitate students' communication skills and embrace the inherent value of diversity through structured discussions, debates, and role-playing activities. Ultimately, the foundation of civil discourse equips students with the essential tools to actively contribute to democratic societies by encouraging a culture of dialogue, collaboration, and informed decision-making.

Establishing rules of civil discourse in classrooms allows for free exchange of ideas and opportunities to learn for students of all ages. There are multiple ways of establishing rules to aid in creating a space for safe and civil discourse. Assigning differing perspectives, lenses, or analytical roles to students was found to expand discussion to focusing the debate on defending with evidence as opposed to opinion. Additionally, adopting a debate style of teaching by asking students to defend multiple sides of the same issue allowed for empathy and understanding in discussing differing opinions of other students. Requiring students to use a three part framework for argument, Assertion, Reasoning, and Evidence (ARE) teaches students to engage in arguments using the content and quality of the reasoning and evidence. Teaching a four-step process for refutation also allows for the students to substantiate their arguments: Restate, Refute, Support, and Conclude. Following this pattern helps teach the ability to resolve opposing ideas and to approach disagreements logically. Allowing students to contribute discussion topics, as well as discourse guidelines, can also lead a productive conversation. This is true for all ages of students, though younger students may need more guidance from teachers. When students discuss subjects that are relevant and matter to them, they are more likely to engage in that conversation and provide legitimate evidence for their argument. Additionally, students know how they would like to be treated in discussion settings, and they should be encouraged to treat others the same. When students contribute to a list of rules that must be followed during discourse, they are more likely to feel respected and engage in the conversation.

Moreover, teaching about civil discourse in the classroom leads to “…effective communication and listening skills [that] can help them develop cognitive competence that will put them in a good position not only in school but will be something they can carry with them throughout life". One of the main purposes of discussing civil discourse in the classroom is for students to model their behavior. A classroom should be a safe place for all to share their opinions and positions without being persecuted and to be treated with respect. However, educators must be aware that students nowadays "get heated" more quickly and need to enforce boundaries. A good way to enforce boundaries is to ensure students back up statements with evidence and to keep an open mind.

Teaching strategies that facilitate discussion about difficult topics are important to learn. One teaching strategy, "Save the Last Word for Me", requires students to participate as active speakers and listeners. In this strategy, students engage with selected material, pick something that stood out to them from the material, and write a few sentences about why they chose their choice. Students are then divided into groups where each student is given a set amount of time to speak. During this time, other students can not interrupt or interject. A student can choose to respond to a previous student if they choose so during their allotted time. The exercise concludes with the starting student getting the "last word" concluding the discussion. Exercises like this promote positive civil discourse and can prepare students to engage in discussions without becoming flustered.

The introduction of new communication technologies, particularly social media, such as Facebook and Twitter, facilitate increased participation, connection, and interactivity, but they also bring challenges like the difficulty in perceiving tone and the potential for misinterpretation. These platforms can enhance educational engagement when used responsibly, but they can also lead to negative psychosocial and interpersonal effects, such as cyberbullying and privacy issues. The civil discourse of using social media is double-edged sword, for instance, using social media for educational purposes can enhance student engagement and improve grades, while excessive or irresponsible use can lead to poor academic performance and negative social effects.

Therefore, higher education professionals should understand how these technologies influence students to support positive outcomes and intervene when necessary. One way is through promoting critical evaluation of online material and responsible use of social media. In such a way, student can navigate these challenges before they get irreversible harms. In addition, higher educational professionals should create policies that frame online interactions as civil spaces and providing support for teaching critical evaluation of online content. Integrating civil discourse in educational settings, both offline and online, should first prepares students for meaningful and respectful engagement in diverse and democratic societies. This approach aligns with the principles of intellectual freedom and supports the development of informed and responsible citizens.

== Civil Discourse & Science ==
Civil discourse refers to the respectful and constructive exchange of ideas and viewpoints. It is vital for scientific progress, which thrives on open inquiry, critical analysis, and the free flow of information. When civil discourse breaks down, scientific advancement can stall due to dogmatism, personal attacks, and the inability to consider alternative perspectives objectively.

=== The Role of Civil Discourse in Scientific Progress ===
Science fundamentally relies on the open exchange of ideas, critical debate, and the testing of hypotheses. Scientists engage in discussions, present their findings, and critique each other's work, which is essential for validating and refining scientific theories. This process of collective deliberation and persuasion, as described by Thomas Kuhn, is how paradigm shifts and new scientific models gradually gain acceptance.

Fostering an environment conducive to civil discourse ensures that critiques focus on methodology and evidence rather than personal attacks. This approach promotes trust, collaboration, and a humble process of discovery among scientists, facilitating a more productive exchange of ideas.

=== Intellectual Property Rights and Freedom of Information ===
Civil discourse in science intersects with intellectual property rights and the freedom of information. Intellectual property rights, such as patents and copyrights, offer protection and incentives for innovation, ensuring that researchers and inventors receive recognition and financial benefits for their work. This protection encourages continued investment in research and development.

On the other hand, the freedom of information ensures that scientific knowledge and discoveries are accessible to the public. Open access to scientific information promotes transparency, collaboration, and the democratization of knowledge, allowing a broader audience to engage with and contribute to scientific discourse.

=== Addressing Epistemic Injustice in science ===
Miranda Fricker's concept of epistemic injustice is highly relevant to scientific discourse. Epistemic injustice occurs when certain individuals or groups are unfairly excluded from contributing to or being recognized within the discourse due to prejudice. By addressing these injustices and incorporating diverse perspectives, scientific discourse can be enriched, and its quality improved.

=== Historical Context and Ethical Considerations ===
Throughout history, civil discourse has played a pivotal role in major scientific advancements, from the Enlightenment period to the development of modern theories and technologies. Recently, the open sharing of data and findings during the COVID-19 pandemic exemplified the importance of civil discourse in addressing global challenges.

Ethical considerations are integral to civil discourse in science. Scientists must adhere to principles of integrity, honesty, and respect in their communications, acknowledging the contributions of others and ensuring accurate and transparent reporting of findings. Furthermore, civil discourse involves addressing ethical issues related to the impact of scientific research on society and engaging with stakeholders to ensure scientific advancements benefit the greater good.

In summary, civil discourse is essential for scientific progress, enabling the free exchange of ideas, addressing epistemic injustices, fostering an inclusive and collaborative environment, and upholding ethical principles. By promoting open communication, intellectual humility, and respect for diverse perspectives, civil discourse enhances the quality and impact of scientific research, ultimately contributing to the betterment of society.

== Civil Discourse & Art ==
In the context of advanced democratic societies, the relationship between art and civil discourse has been a topic of significant exploration. Art, with its transformative power, has often been at the forefront of challenging established norms and promoting free speech, making it an essential component of civil discourse. Art and Anarchy, a collection of lectures by the art historian Edgar Wind discusses the tension between art and societal norms. He argues true artistic innovation often comes from challenging or even rebelling against established conventions. One central question he struggled with is the moral responsibility of art. Should art uphold societal values, or is its primary duty to challenge and provoke? Wind suggests that art's true power lies in its ability to question and disrupt, but this also comes with a moral weight.

=== Historical Context and Usage ===
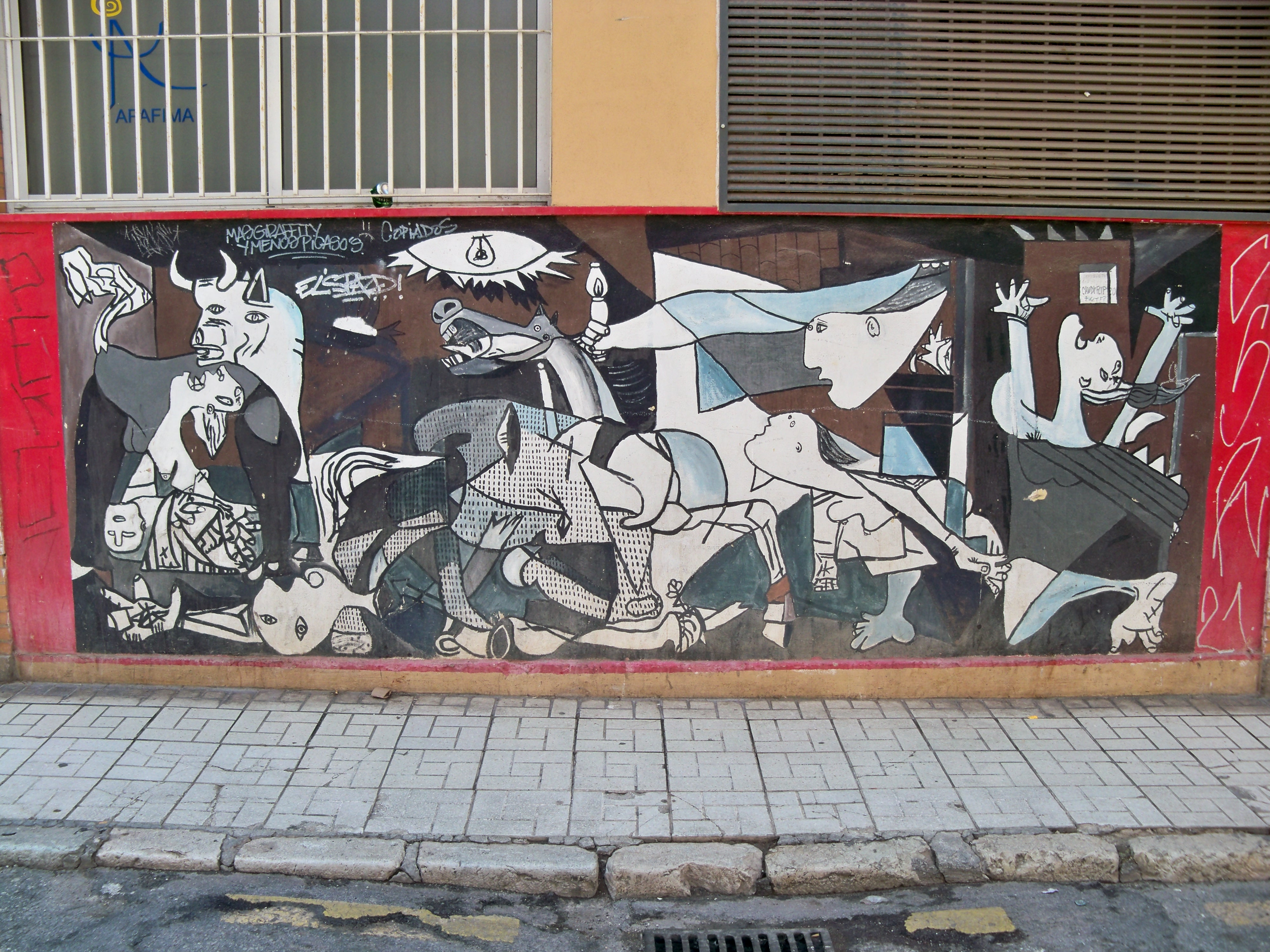
Picasso's response to the bombing of the Basque town named Guernica on April 26, 1937, during the Spanish Civil War.

Throughout history, artists have used their craft to comment on societal norms, political events, and cultural shifts. As John Dewey argues in Art as Experience, art is a form of experience that helps society understand itself better. A famous example being Johnathan Swift's satiric piece A Modest Proposal(1729), criticizing the treatment of impoverished Irish citizens. Similarly, American music and visual arts during the 1960s and 1970s, such as Marvin Gaye's What's Going On, reflected anti-Vietnam War sentiments and civil rights movements. In recent pieces of media members of the Black/African American community have made efforts to highlight the complexity of civil rights and civil discourse. Hidden Figures (2016) directed by Theodore Melfiand written by Allison Schroeder speaks to this in the line "Civil rights aint always civil." This line acknowledges the history of civil discourse and the cost associated with such efforts.

=== Universality of Art ===
The universal nature of art means that it can be understood and appreciated by people from all walks of life. This universality allows for a broader audience to engage in discussions, fostering understanding and empathy among diverse groups. The Mona Lisa's enigmatic smile, for instance, has been a subject of numerous interpretations, reflecting the idea that art is subjective and open to multiple readings. From an ethical standpoint, the universality of art promotes inclusivity and challenges ethnocentrism.

==== Art's Resistance to History ====
Art possesses a unique ability to stand against, and even resist, historical narratives, especially those characterized by oppression. By subjecting reality to its own set of laws and forms, art presents an alternative reality that negates the established one. However, this dynamic relationship with history means that art's definition can evolve. What might be considered art in one societal context can transform into pseudo-art in another. A notable example is Dostoevsky's work, which, while being an authentic oeuvre, carries a regressive political message. Yet, the regressive content is absorbed and transformed by the artistic form itself, emphasizing the transformative power of art.

Art as a Form of Counter-Narrative: Art often serves as a counter-narrative to dominant historical discourses, offering alternative perspectives that challenge established views[84]. This can be seen in the way contemporary Ukrainian artists respond to the war in their country, using art to document, resist, and create new narratives[85]. Art's Role in Postcolonial Discourse: Art can play a significant role in postcolonial discourse by addressing the complexities of history and identity. It can serve as a means of healing and accepting a hybrid past without the imposition of imperial or national patterns[86]. Metahistorical Perspectives: The concept of metahistory, as discussed by Hayden White, suggests that historians, like artists, construct rather than merely reflect reality. This view posits that historical writing has aesthetic and ethical dimensions, which can be linked to the ways art interacts with and resists historical narratives[86]. Art as a Medium of Social and Political Critique: Art can critique social and political conditions, often revealing underlying power structures and injustices. For example, Native artists use their work to express personal and cultural values, engaging viewers in counter-storytelling as a form of resilience[87]. Dostoevsky's Political Messages: Fyodor Dostoevsky's literary works explore the human condition within the troubled political, social, and spiritual atmospheres of 19th-century Russia. His novels engage with philosophical and religious themes, often reflecting his complex relationship with the political ideologies of his time[88]. Art's Transformative Power: The transformative power of art is evident in how it can absorb and repurpose content, including regressive political messages, into something that transcends its original context. This transformative aspect highlights art's ability to engage with and alter historical narratives.

Music's Resistance to History

Music has a history of conveying the human experience in an authentic and unifying way. Music is especially powerful in conveying human experiences and history as the message is often more important than the sound. People inherently connect to their own language, dialects, and rhetoric as a species meant to bond with each other. This auditory connection can span across languages and cultures in the case of artists like ABBA and Paul Williams. As such people have utilized music to speak to oppression and neglect that they have faced. This is commonly attributed rap music of the 1980s and 1990s in America.

Dances' Resistance to History

- See Alvin Ailey Dance Company

Civil discourse in dance can be traced back to various periods and contexts where dance served as a medium for communication, expression, and debate. For instance, in the later Graeco-Roman world, dance was intertwined with literary and philosophical discourse, highlighting the relationship between dance, language, and deixis. The mimetic force of dance was compared to visual art and oratory, emphasizing its experiential and cognitive impact[89].

In more contemporary settings, dance has been a platform for civil discourse through its ability to bring together diverse communities and foster dialogue. Social dancing scenes, for example, are often spaces where individuals share experiences, discuss workshops and festivals, and engage in conversations about the art form2. Dance can also be a mode of theorization, addressing social and political issues such as mobilization, embodiment, subjectivities, and representation[90].

Digital Art's Resistance to History

- Ask "Is Digital Art Real Art"

=== Challenges and Criticisms ===
While art can be a potent tool for civil discourse, it's not without challenges. Interpretations can vary, leading to controversies. "The Holy Virgin Mary" by Chris Ofili faced criticism for being blasphemous. In authoritarian regimes, artists like Ai Weiwei face censorship. Philosophically, this raises questions about the limits of freedom of expression and the role of art in challenging or reinforcing societal norms. Kant's "Critique of Judgment" discusses the tension between aesthetic judgment and moral imperatives in art.

=== Destructive Tolerance and Art ===
Destructive tolerance' is a nuanced concept that underscores the potential pitfalls of an overly accommodating approach to art. While tolerance is generally seen as a virtue, especially in democratic societies, there's a risk when it becomes indiscriminate. For instance, if all forms of art, regardless of their message or intent, are accepted without critique, the transformative power of truly revolutionary art can be diluted. Such a phenomenon can lead to the protest inherent in art against established realities being overshadowed. A Critique of Pure Tolerance (1969) mentions the danger of 'benevolent neutrality' towards art, where the radical impact of art against the established reality can be swallowed up by a 'complacent receptacle'. Despite these challenges, it's widely recognized that any form of censorship towards art and literature is regressive.

== Civil Discourse Online ==
With the constant development and improvement of , journalists, corporations, individuals, etc. are focused on the creation and maintenance of an online presence in order to stay current. Social media influences are constantly creating new content across multiple platforms giving viewers access to comment, news articles and updates are being posted on news websites with interactive features, small and big businesses are creating websites to facilitate online shopping and browsing with access to reviews and other interactive features. This accessibility brings forward the necessity for civil discourse and the importance and limitations of free speech. However research shows that individuals tend to engage with content that aligns with their already established believes. While personalization can be a great tool in helping us find the information we are seeking in a faster more efficient way, it can also have the potential to narrow our viewpoints in a phenomenon referred to as the "filter bubble". This article highlights that people have the tendency to seek information that confirms their viewpoints and avoid information that contradicts it. Defining the term "filter bubble" as an individual that self-imposes a filter or viewpoint in order to actively seek (or avoid) reading or listening to information of a different perspective.

From a political perspective users are more likely to filter out their searches and social media profiles in order to only see information from others that share the same political views. "About 60% of American adults reported social media interactions with other users with opposing political views to be stressful and frustrating while a much smaller proportion (34%) found them interesting or informative." In the United States online news outlets have noticed these patterns and have adjusted their publications using targeted language as click bate. For instance, news sites owned by the same company will publish articles that contain nearly the same information, but they will adjust one title to reflect language that resonates with Democrats and one that attracts a more Republican leaning audience. The problem with this type of filtering is that it limits the amount of civil discourse that occurs between the users, given that they all share a similar point of view. An article posted by the Journal of Broadcasting & Electronic Media reflecting on the effects of civil and uncivil disagreements noted that on a news article about abortion the comment section received a lot of engagement. Interestingly enough comments with negative and aggressive intentions were more likely to get replies back and gained overall more integration than kindhearted comments. Bringing into question the effects that the online work has on politeness and the civility of individuals.

=== In Social Media ===
The growth of social media has brought a lot of concerns regarding civil discourse. As discussed previously, the mask of online anonymity encourages sharing good and supportive feedback just as much as negative and aggressively intentioned comments. Many see these online interactions are a way to educate and share differing points of view while others argue the need for stricter rules on what should be considered hate speech. Comments with aggressive intentions can be reported and deleted, accounts can be banned if the content is deemed inappropriate for the platform. Although hate speech should not be allowed or encouraged, all these are forms of censorship highlight the question "Are online interactions aiding or harming freedom of expression? is it decreasing civil discourse while encouraging uncivil discourse?"

The widespread issues with hate speech across social media platforms has encouraged researchers to find ways of encouraging civil discourse and creating a better online environment for all users. Typically, an increase in hateful content has been targeting individuals based on their ethnicity, sexual orientation, gender, social class, and physical appearance, potentially causing mental health issues, anxiety, fear and social isolation, as well as encouraging discrimination, prejudice. Articles such as Promoting civil discourse on social media using nudges: A tournament of seven interventions hope to address these issues by promoting civil discourse and creating a safe space where users can share their ideas and opinions, using their freedom of expression without fear of discrimination or harm. We can all share our opinion and not necessarily agree but we must do so with respect, honesty and empathy, maintaining an open mind.

== Civil Discourse in Other Forms ==
Discourse is not just limited to verbal communication, or language for that matter. For example, gang members know how to recognize friendly gang members and rival gang members based on physical features such as what colors one is wearing, what symbols (graffiti) are used, what street one is stationed at, and so many more non-verbal ways of expressing one's allegiance. The way individuals act and perform their daily lives can come into conflict or agreeance with others based on how they act and perform in their daily lives. This all can be done without verbal discourse. Though civil discourse demands respect which can be difficult if individuals are basing their point of views on these physical features.

The Socratic method (also known as method of Elenchus, elenctic method, or Socratic debate) is a form of cooperative argumentative dialogue between individuals, based on asking and answering questions to stimulate critical thinking and to draw out ideas and underlying presuppositions. The Socratic method is a method of hypothesis elimination, in that better hypotheses are found by steadily identifying and eliminating those that lead to contradictions. It is named after the Classical Greek philosopher Socrates who is the protagonist featured across Plato's works. Perhaps the best sentence to summarize Socrates' motivation for the Socratic method is his own words: "The unexamined life is not worth living".

Socratic circles, an established instructional approach rooted in the Socratic method, represents the epitome of civil discourse within the structure of education. These structured discussions, created by open-ended questioning and critical inquiry, foster an environment conducive to thoughtful reflection, exploration, and respectful exchanges of ideas. By encouraging students to actively engage in dialogue, challenge assumptions, and provide evidence-based arguments, Socratic circles help create and nurture vital skills such as active listening, empathy, and the ability to construct well-reasoned arguments. The facilitator's role in guiding the conversation and ensuring equitable participation further reinforces the principles of civil discourse, promoting an inclusive and democratic learning atmosphere. Through the examination of diverse perspectives, Socratic circles serve as transformative spaces where students refine their critical thinking abilities, develop an understanding of complex issues, and learn how to use the essential tools necessary for effective communication in academic and real-world situations.

== Challenges to Civil Discourse ==
In her introduction to her book Epistemic Injustice, Miranda Fricker identified two lenses through which discourse may be viewed as unjust: testimonial injustice, the prejudice of the listener which causes them to give a deflated level of credibility to the speaker's word, and hermeneutical injustice, a gap in the collective experience that puts someone at an unfair disadvantage when it comes to making sense of their social experience. These two forms of injustice may alter the outcome of discourse due to the speaker not being viewed as credible or not being able to engage in discourse in the first place. More specifically, Fricker theorized them as a wrong done to someone specifically in their capacity as a knower. Fricker stated, "Eradicating these injustices would ultimately take not just more virtuous hearers, but collective social political change-in matters of epistemic injustice, the ethical is political." An example of testimonial injustice is when a person is dismissed or not heard because of their gender, race, accent or other difference. An example of hermeneutical injustice is a woman who has been sexually harassed in a culture where this behavior would be dismissed. For instance, suppose a woman works in a work environment where a sexual harassment is perceived as a form of 'flirting', and a rejection of it would be commonly perceived as a 'lack of sense of humor'. In this context, when a woman is sexually harassed, she will have difficulty of finding the appropriate words to communicate the case to others because she lacks the concept of sexual harassment of the workplace.

The free exchange of ideas in civil discourse may be hampered by epistemic injustice, as discussed by Fricker. Testimonial injustice, where the testimony of some individuals is undervalued due to prejudiced biases, undermines the credibility of certain voices, hence weakening the foundations of civil discourse. Additionally, hermeneutical injustice obscures significant areas of social experience from collective understanding due to structural identity prejudice, thereby limiting the full participation of marginalized groups in civil discourse. In other words, hermeneutical injustices often prevent marginalized groups from understanding their experience, which limits their knowledge, understanding, and political position. Thus, Fricker's concept of epistemic injustice highlights the need to ensure fairness in the knowledge dynamics of civil discourse.

The definition of civil discourse requiring avoiding "open contempt" may disproportionately harm members of marginalized communities by undermining or distracting from the legitimacy of expressions of rage. Philosopher Herbert Marcuse wrote,

[I]f a newscaster reports the torture and murder of civil rights workers in the same unemotional tone he uses to describe the stock-market or the weather, or with the same great emotion with which he says his commercials, then such objectivity is spurious- more, it offends against humanity and truth by being calm where one should be enraged, by refraining from accusation where accusation is in the facts themselves. The tolerance expressed in such impartiality serves to minimize or even absolve prevailing intolerance and suppression.

The interplay of freedom and fairness in civil discourse also brings to the fore the question of tolerance, as explored by Marcuse in "Repressive Tolerance." Marcuse criticizes the concept of absolute tolerance, arguing that it can result in "repressive tolerance," where oppressive ideas are given as much weight as liberating ones, potentially leading to the perpetuation of injustice. This seemingly paradoxical perspective cautions against an uncritical application of tolerance in civil discourse, emphasizing the need to scrutinize the potential consequences of tolerating certain ideas.

If the goal of civil discourse is to enhance understanding, then quieting or dismissing the truth in messages from historically underrepresented or harmed communities because they make visible "contempt" misses the aim of improving understanding—an interaction which has the consequence of reinforcing pre-existing systems of oppression, including communicative and informational oppression, whether intentional or otherwise.

The implementation of fallacious arguments can all too easily invalidate the efforts of one party to make their case. James L. Gibson notes that throughout history the utilization of ad hominem arguments to disparage an opponent's character often delegitimizes their defense. Leaving the aggressor as the de facto victor as it then becomes unnecessary for them to refute any previous points made. In such exchanges very little benefit can be derived as the conversation is never able to evolve and more often than not the aggressor's party seeks only to serve their own ends.

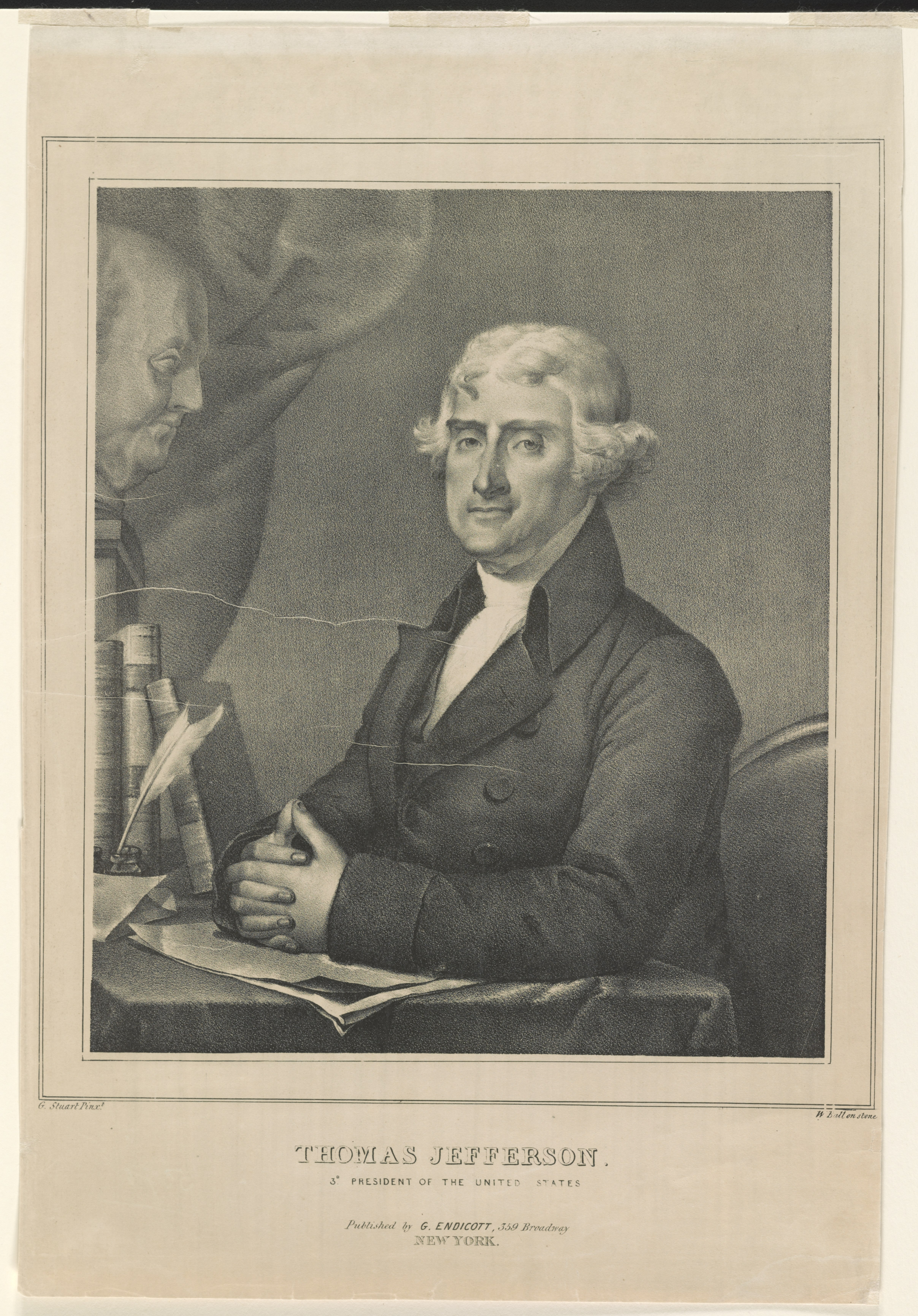
Thomas Jefferson is one of the authors of the United States' Constitution, which, among other things, endows American citizens with the freedom of speech.

In On Liberty, John Stuart Mill argues that the truth will emerge only in an environment of free expression. Thomas Jefferson makes a similar argument in Virginia's Bill for Establishing Religious Freedom, a precursor to the First Amendment to the United States Constitution, where he said, "Truth is great and will prevail if left to herself. She is the proper and sufficient antagonist to error, and has nothing to fear from the conflict, unless, by human interposition, disarmed of her natural weapons, free argument and debate; errors ceasing to be dangerous when it is permitted freely to contradict them." As media analysts like Brooke Gladstone of On the Media have pointed out, no law of nature provides for the triumph of reason. History and the internet are proof that this belief is itself an untruth. Gladstone wrote in The Trouble with Reality: A Rumination on Moral Panic in Our Time (2017), "Part of the problem stems from the fact that facts, even a lot of facts, do not constitute reality. Reality is what forms after we filter, arrange, and prioritize those facts and marinate them in our values and traditions. Reality is personal." Gladstone argues that most individuals will not seek for truth in a sea of information with varying levels of truthfulness and are more likely to agree with opinions that agree with their existing worldview—a tendency referred to as confirmation bias. In addition, people and organizations may now, as they have in the past, simply invent new reasoning for actions that previously would have been considered wrong or unethical. Psychologist Johnathan Haidt argued that reasoning is more effective as a way to justify actions than navigating to truth. He wrote,

If you think that moral reasoning is something we do to figure out the truth, you'll be constantly frustrated by how foolish, biased, and illogical people become when they disagree with you. But if you think about moral reasoning as a skill we humans evolved to further our social agendas—to justify our own actions and to defend the teams we belong to—then things will make a lot more sense.

Money as speech has further complicated this matter. People like Mill and Jefferson expected honest disagreement among people with a similar reach. They had no way to foresee that big business would know the truth, pay scientists to lie about it, and create civic organizations and think tanks for the purpose of spreading the lie. Jürgen Habermas stated that discourse stands "with two assumptions: (a) that normative claims to validity have cognitive meaning and can be treated like claims to truth and (b) that the justification of Norma and commands requires that a real discourse be carried out." Thus, it does not need to be the entire truth to use a point or argument in a discourse as long as it is treated like the truth.

In an essay on discourse ethics titled "The Ethics of Discourse" by John M. Budd, he states that "As each person listens, that person must keep an open mind to what is said and to weight it according to the process and content requirements." He then goes on to explain that people engaging in civil discourse have an ethical responsibility to put their own bias away and engage with an open mind. This is not just a responsibility but a necessary action that must be met for all parties to agree that the discourse was indeed civil.

Other challenges include the possibility of uncivil behavior leading to censorship. This leads to fear between both sides and attempts to use the government levers to punish those on the other side. This, in turn, could lead to protests, which can be considered insulting and uncivil but is an approach that can gain attention to the cause, according to the Charles Koch Institute.

The paradox of tolerance is also a challenge to civil discourse through the argument that the freedom of expression has limits. According to the paradox of tolerance, tolerating the intolerant will eventually lead to the intolerant destroying tolerance within the society. In other words, tolerance must have limits if a society is to remain truly tolerant and accepting. In many cases, tolerance can be used as an act of oppression against the marginalized within a society. A humane society must have the goal of tolerance, which includes the elimination of violence and the protection of people from cruelty and injustice. In relation to civil discourse, civil arguments about subjects such human rights or injustices could be considered not constructive under the paradox of tolerance. If the goal is to advance the public interest, even hearing out polite intolerance will eventually result in a less tolerant society.

Lastly, the classified nature of some information challenges civil discourse through forced censorship. A good example of this is classified information that only government officials or even as high up as the President are privy to. However, the importance of preservation comes into play here, as documents that were once classified and unavailable to the public are supposed to eventually become public record at a later date. What this encourages is not only accountability but truthfulness for those involved in confidential matters. If those involved know that the records will one day be open information for public scrutiny, then it should encourage honest and rational behavior today.

== Combating Misinformation to Improve Civil Discourse ==
Recent research highlights the profound impact of misinformation and disinformation on civil discourse, with several key findings and initiatives shedding light on this issue. Disinformation undermines democratic processes by eroding trust in institutions and spreading false narratives that can lead to real-world consequences, such as violence and policy changes. For instance, disinformation campaigns often exploit social and racial divisions, perpetuating inequality and justifying discriminatory policies. The January 6th insurrection and the spread of COVID-19 misinformation are notable examples where disinformation had dire societal impacts.

=== Educational interventions ===
Addressing the issue of disinformation involves enhancing media literacy, particularly among young people. Research from Stanford University emphasizes the importance of teaching high school students how to critically evaluate online content. Their studies found that many students struggle to distinguish between credible news and misleading information. Programs like Stanford's Civic Online Reasoning curriculum aim to equip students with the necessary skills to navigate the digital information landscape.

=== Technological and community responses ===
In Taiwan, civil society groups have implemented comprehensive media literacy programs to combat the spread of disinformation, especially in light of emerging threats from AI-generated content. These initiatives include training in cybersecurity and open-source intelligence, as well as workshops to recognize and counteract AI-manipulated information.

=== Historical and Cultural Contexts ===
A critical approach to disinformation research examines how historical and cultural narratives shape and are shaped by disinformation. By understanding the power dynamics and historical contexts that influence the spread of false information, researchers can better address the roots and impacts of disinformation. This includes analyzing how disinformation perpetuates racial and social inequalities and how it has been used historically to maintain power structures.

Overall, the research underscores that combating disinformation requires a multifaceted approach, involving education, technological innovation, and a deep understanding of historical and cultural contexts. Effective strategies must consider the diverse ways in which disinformation impacts different communities and work towards empowering individuals with the skills and knowledge to discern and challenge false information.

== Civil Discourse & Civil Disobedience ==
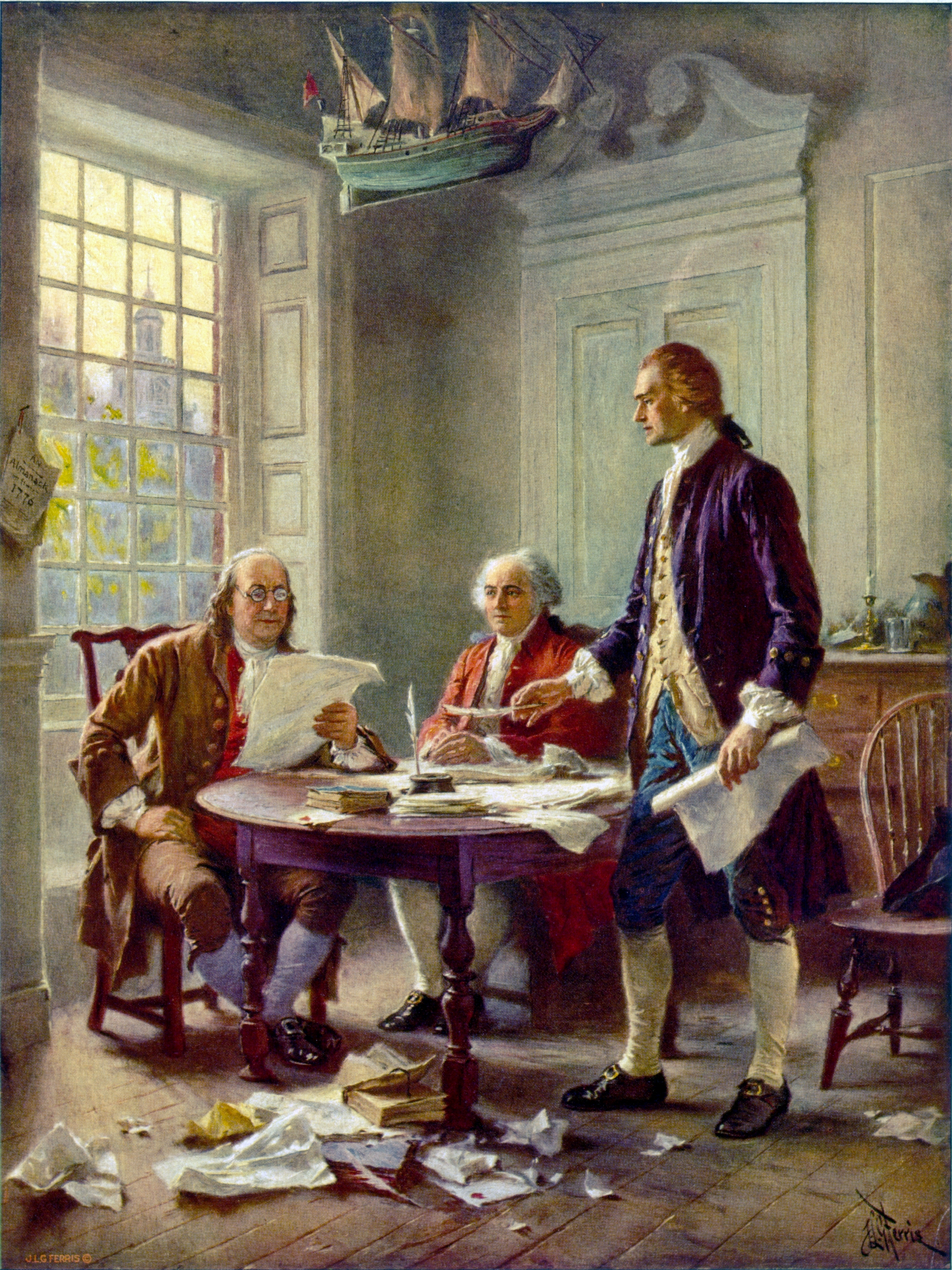
Thomas Jefferson, Benjamin Franklin, and Thomas Paine writing the Declaration of Independence 1776

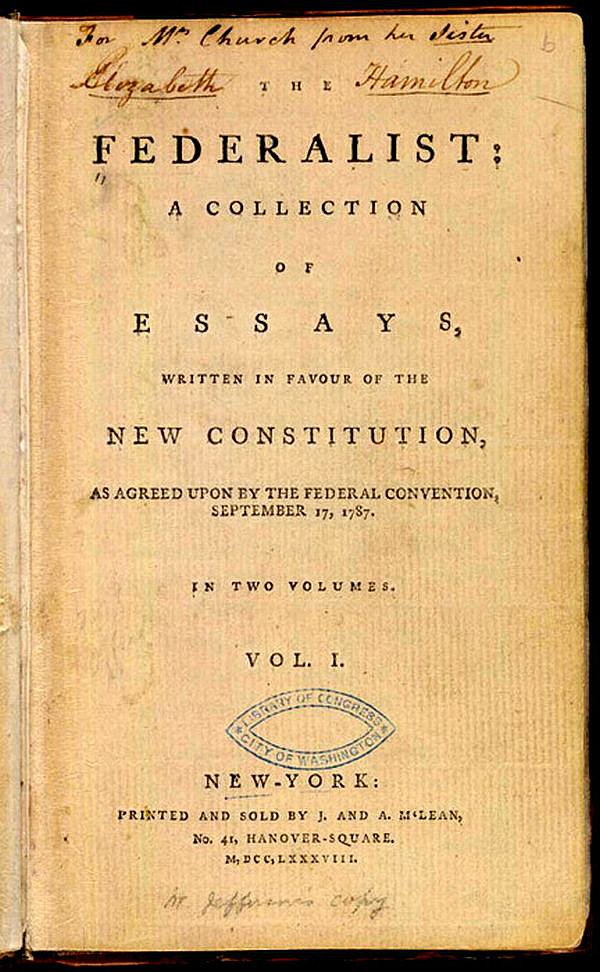
The Federalist (1st ed, 1788, vol I, title page)

The American Revolution is an example of Civil Discourse in the history of the United States of America. Benjamin Franklin, Thomas Jefferson, and Thomas Paine were key figures by having passionate debates, articulating essays, and trying to build support for independence from the British Rule. Thomas Paine's Common Sense, and Thomas Jefferson's draft of the Declaration of Independence were documents used present their arguments and advocate for independence with the support of the colonists. James Madison, Alexander Hamilton, and John Jay created the Federalist Papers which demonstrated the civil discourse as they presented their arguments of adopting the Constitution. The essays addressed the claims, counter claims, objections, and proposes a strong central government with structure.

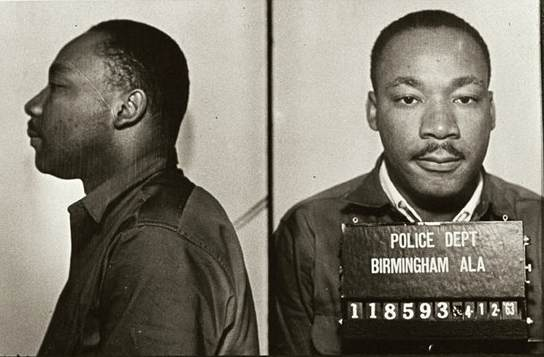
Martin Luther King Jr. arrested on April 12th, 1963, making this his 13th arrest at the time.

The American Civil Rights Movement of the 50's and 60's demonstrates the need for both civil discourse and civil disobedience. In order for individuals to truly partake in civil discourse an environment of toleration must be understood and accepted. This environment of toleration will allow for real "intellectual disagreements" as opposed to disagree due to the color of one's skin, in the case of the American Civil Rights Movement. However, toleration was in short supply, and laws existed to suppress those rights allowing true civil discourse. Thus, civil disobedience was used as a tool to expose these unjust laws. Individuals such as Martin Luther King Jr. acted against these unjust laws, but "willingly accepted the punishment that came with violating the law". Civil discourse and civil disobedience are just that, "civil". Though one aims to bring change by communication while the other aims to bring change by disobedience.

On the note that civil disobedience is a tool to expose unjust laws, late Congress Representative John Lewis lived by this mantra. Lewis said it was important to engage in "good trouble, necessary trouble" in order to achieve change, and he held to this credo throughout his life.

Lewis' work and commitment to "good trouble" inspire generations to come, serving as an example for standing up against injustice, challenging oppressive systems, and creating a more equitable society. Through the advocacy of civil rights and social justice, society can engage in improving mankind and catalyzing change. In "Repressive Tolerance", Herbert Marcuse states,

Tolerance of free speech is the way of improvement, of progress in liberation, not because there is no objective truth, and improvement must necessarily be a compromise between a variety of opinions, but because there is and objective truth which can be discovered, ascertained only in learning and comprehending that which is and that which can be and ought to be done for the sake of improving the lot of mankind.

Creating a more equitable society starts with civil discourse through listening and understanding distinct perspectives. By practicing this principle, members of society can then engage in a philosophy that allows progress and improvement of social systems.

== National Institute for Civil Discourse ==
To reach a broader audience, the University of Arizona created The National Institute for Civil Discourse (NICD) in 2011. The NICD is a non-partisan organization based out of Tucson, Arizona, that believes in the power of civil discourse to transcend party divides. Their key principles include constructively engaging differences, listening for understanding, empathy, humility, conscience, principled advocacy, and common ground. The Institute highlights the importance of being open-minded and listening to the arguments others make, but also stand firm without resorting to character attacks when rebutting others' claims. Furthermore, they express that it is important to "acknowledge shared values, aspirations, and experience and to call out points of agreement." The founding chairmen are former U.S. presidents George H. W. Bush and Bill Clinton, with board members such as Madeleine Albright, Katie Couric, and former U.S. Congresswoman Gabrielle Giffords.

The NICD receives grants and funding for a number of research projects to advance the theory, understanding, and practical application of civil discourse. Their focus is primarily in politics as a response to the growing divide in the United States' political arena, yet their research supports a broad application. NICD research projects include "The Concept of Civility in Modern Political Philosophy", "Civility in State Legislatures, Political Polarization", "The Role of Rhetoric and Emotions in Civil Discourse", "A Crisis of Civility? Political Discourse and its Discontents", and multiple projects that focus on civil discourse and conduct during United States presidential and Senate debates.

== See also ==
- Argumentation theory
- Arne Næss § Recommendations for public debate
- Citizens for Civil Discourse
- Civic virtue
- Deliberative democracy
- Discourse analysis
- Discourse community
- Discourse ethics
- Epistemic injustice
- Epistemic responsibility
- Epistemic virtue
- Etiquette
- Etiquette in technology
- Paradox of tolerance
- Pragma-dialectics § Rules for critical discussion
- Rhetoric
- Rogerian argument
- Self-censorship
- Speech code
