= Carel (disambiguation) =

Carel is a given name.

Carel may also refer to:

- Carel (surname)
- Carel Industries – Italian HVAC manufacturer (founded 1973)

== See also ==
- Carels
- Carl (disambiguation)
