= Carel (surname) =

Carel is a surname. Notable people with the surname include:

- Agnès Carel (born 1968), French politician
- Havi Carel, Israeli philosopher
- Agnès Carel (born 1968), French politician
- John Carel, 19th century American politician
- Roger Carel (1927–2020), French actor

== See also ==
- Carels
