= Intellectual diversity =

Political term

Intellectual diversity, also called viewpoint diversity, is a term used to describe claims about the lack of diverse political viewpoints within higher education in the United States. The term is commonly used in the context of political debates over the perceived lack of conservative voices at universities, and is often associated with appeals for greater conservative representation within academia.

== Definition ==
There is no consensus definition of the term among academics. It is often used interchangeably with viewpoint diversity, ideological diversity, and political diversity. Epidemiologist Tyler VanderWeele wrote that intellectual diversity should be defined as "the range and distribution of systems of thought held by persons or systematically presented within a given academic context". He also said that the topic is so broad that it is "effectively impossible to fully characterize". VanderWeele stated that intellectual diversity should be distinguished from disagreements about specific viewpoints because he believes that it is more difficult to "present and consider arguments for and against ... an entire system of thought [than a] particular viewpoint". Legal scholar Sean M. Kammer stated that the term conflates intellectualism with political ideology, and that it should be redefined as diversity of scholarly work within an academic discipline.

== History ==
The term was popularized by conservative writer David Horowitz in a 2003 document presented as an Academic Bill of Rights. It refers to the perceived overrepresentation of liberal academics at American universities.

=== Legislation and policy ===
In 2021, Texas House Bill 3979 generated widespread media attention concerning controversy about teaching "opposing" viewpoints with regard to Holocaust education.

In 2024, the US state of Indiana enacted Senate Bill 202, requiring "intellectual diversity" in Indiana public colleges and universities. However, the bill prohibits academics "from lecturing about political views not related to their purview". Several academics have been sanctioned under the law. The law provides a mechanism for students to submit complaints to universities, which are then reviewed. Indiana University received nine complaints in 2024 and ten complaints in 2025 that were deemed legitimate; these complaints took issue with (among other things) criticism of Israel, the presentation of video footage of demonstrators opposed to the war in Gaza, and the display of a graphic that categorized Columbus Day and the Make America Great Again ethos as manifestations of white supremacy. A greater number of complaints were received that the university deemed frivolous.

In 2025, the US state of Ohio enacted Senate Bill 1 with the stated intent of promoting intellectual diversity; the legislation also bans diversity, equity, and inclusion (DEI) initiatives in public colleges and universities within Ohio.

In October 2025, during Donald Trump's second term as US president, his administration proposed the "Compact for Academic Excellence in Higher Education". It sought to impose viewpoint diversity policies in public colleges and universities and urged universities to "transform or abolish institutional units that purposefully punish, belittle, and even spark violence against conservative ideas."

== Analysis ==
Scholars have taken different views on the term intellectual diversity. Many scholars have criticized it as politically loaded. Literary scholar and legal theorist Stanley Fish wrote that the term lacks meaningful content; it is "used for political purposes by conservatives in the culture wars over academia". Philosopher Kristie Dotson wrote that the concept represents "the diversity of political opinion primarily among people racialized as white". Geographer Reecia Orzeck has argued that the concept represents a threat to academic freedom.

In contrast, legal scholar Michael Stokes Paulsen wrote that the term should be considered a "secondary and instrumental" value to "intellectual rigor and quality and the search for intellectual 'Truth'". In a Harvard Radcliffe Institute white paper, several scholars said that despite the concept being "inconsistently defined and unevenly pursued", it is "essential to the academic mission". Psychologist Steven Pinker said, "Viewpoint diversity is crucial, but difficult and subtle, ideal in intellectual discourse", but further argued that imposing it by government fiat could lead to ridiculous or Orwellian results.

== See also ==
- Intellectual freedom – Freedom to hold, receive and disseminate ideas without restriction
- Intellectual humility – Recognition of the limit of one's knowledge
- Marketplace of ideas – Rationale for freedom of expression in a liberal democracy
- Relativism – Philosophical view rejecting objectivity

== Sources ==
- Belgal, Amogh (February 3, 2026). "How many intellectual diversity complaints did IU receive in 2025?". Indiana Daily Student.
- Brown-Nagin, Tomiko; Reuben, Julie A.; Whittington, Keith E.; et al. (May 5, 2026). "Intellectual Diversity and the Mission of Higher Education". Harvard Radcliffe Institute. Archived from the original on July 7, 2026.
- Collier, Ian (December 8, 2025). "IU lecturer returns to class under supervision". Indiana Daily Student.
- Dotson, Kristie (2018). "On Intellectual Diversity and Differences That May Not Make a Difference". Ethics and Education. 13 (1): 123–140. doi:10.1080/17449642.2018.1428715.
- Fish, Stanley (February 13, 2004). "'Intellectual Diversity': The Trojan Horse of a Dark Design". The Chronicle Review. The Chronicle of Higher Education. Vol. 50, no. 23. p. B13. Archived from the original on December 1, 2005.
- —, — (2007). "Intellectual Diversity: What Is It and Do We Need It?". The Montana Professor. Vol. 17, no. 2.
- Fournier, Greg; Hess, Frederick M. (December 12, 2025). "The Marketplace of Ideas in the Higher Education Compact". American Enterprise Institute.
- Harasimowicz, Sam (May 26, 2025). "Education Advocates Want Voters to Decide on DEI Ban in Ohio Colleges, Universities". WCPO.
- Kammer, Sean M. (2021). "The 'Intellectual Diversity' Crisis That Isn't: Liberal Faculties, Conservative Victims, and the Cynical Effort to Undermine Higher Education for Political Gain" (PDF). Articles. Quinnipiac Law Review. 39: 149–224. Archived (PDF) from the original on February 10, 2026.
- Miller, Andrew (June 11, 2026). "IU Lecturer's Contract to End After 'MAGA' Graphic Controversy". The Herald-Times. Bloomington, Indiana. NewsBank 1A8AC9F733EBEE60.
- Moody, Josh (May 22, 2026). "Trump's Accreditation Overhaul Advances". Inside Higher Ed. Archived from the original on May 25, 2026.
- Orzeck, Reecia (2012). "Academic Freedom, Intellectual Diversity, and the Place of Politics in Geography". Antipode. 44 (4): 1449–1469. Bibcode:2012Antip..44.1449O. doi:10.1111/j.1467-8330.2011.00965.x.
- Paulsen, Michael Stokes (2014). "The Uneasy Case for Intellectual Diversity" (PDF). Essays. Harvard Journal of Law & Public Policy. 37 (1): 145–164. Archived (PDF) from the original on April 21, 2026.
- Rosenzweig, Ben (September 3, 2025). "IU Professor Sanctioned Under Indiana's 'Intellectual Diversity' to File Grievance". The Herald-Times. Bloomington, Indiana. NewsBank 1A2E2E9316C9FFE8.
- Schuessler, Jennifer (May 5, 2025). "Trump and Harvard Both Want 'Viewpoint Diversity'. What Does It Mean?". The New York Times.
- VanderWeele, Tyler J. (2025). "Intellectual and Viewpoint Diversity: Importance, Scope and Bounds". Education Sciences. 15 (12) 1592. doi:10.3390/educsci15121592.
- Wright, Aubrey (August 24, 2024). "Indiana College 'Intellectual Diversity' and Tenure Law Into Effect". Indiana Public Media.
