= Miranda Fricker =

English philosopher and feminist (born 1966)

Miranda Fricker FBA FAAAS
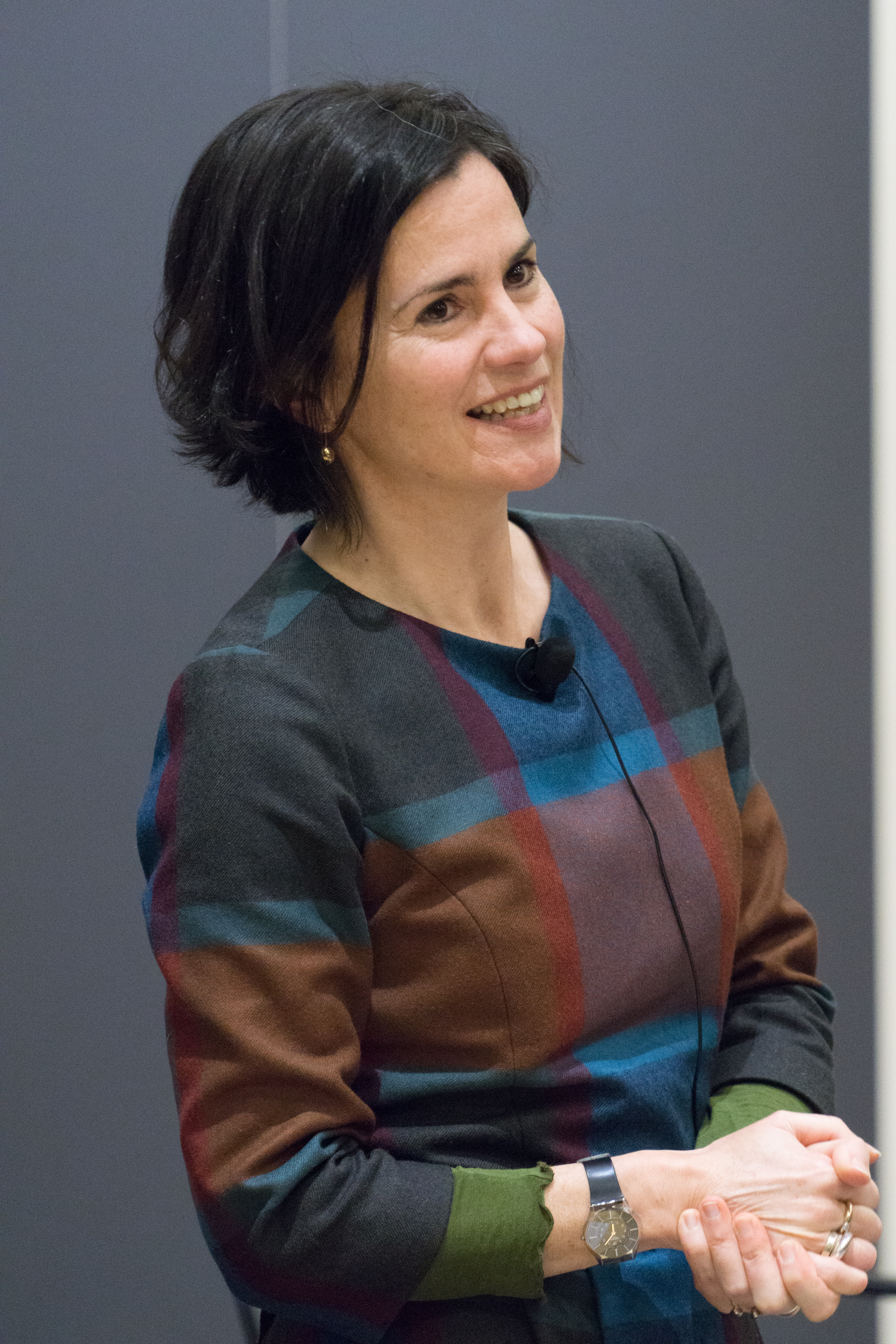
- Fricker in 2016
- Born: 12 March 1966 (age 60)

Education
- Education: Pembroke College, Oxford
- Doctoral advisors: Sabina Lovibond, Bernard Williams

Philosophical work
- Era: Contemporary philosophy
- Region: Western philosophy
- School: Analytic philosophy Analytic feminism
- Institutions: New York University, Graduate Center, CUNY, University of Sheffield, Birkbeck, University of London
- Main interests: Ethics, social epistemology, feminist epistemology
- Notable ideas: Epistemic injustice

Miranda Fricker (born 12 March 1966) is a British philosopher and feminist, serving as the Julius Silver Professor of Philosophy at New York University and Co-director of the New York Institute of Philosophy. Fricker originated the theory of epistemic injustice, coining the term.

The concept has been influential well beyond academic philosophy, notably in healthcare; the Care Quality Commission, England's regulator of health and social care, describes it as "a key concept for us as a regulator" in its updated human rights approach.

== Biography ==
=== Early life and education ===
Fricker received her D.Phil. from the University of Oxford in 1996, co-supervised by Sabina Lovibond and Bernard Williams.

=== Professorship ===
She taught at Heythrop College, Birkbeck College, the University of Sheffield and the Graduate Center, CUNY, before moving to New York University in 2022.

She was elected a Fellow of the British Academy in 2016 and a Fellow of the American Academy of Arts and Sciences in 2020. She served as President of the American Philosophical Association (Eastern Division) for 2022–23, delivering her presidential address, "How Is Forgiveness Always a Gift?", in January 2022. She has contributed to numerous BBC radio programmes, including four editions of In Our Time.

She has been invited to give a number of named lecture series, including the Whitehead Lectures at Harvard University (2024), the Uehiro Lectures at the University of Oxford (2026), the Dewey Lectures at Columbia University (2026), and the Tanner Lectures at the University of California, Berkeley (2027).

From 2015 she served as Moral Philosopher on the Spoliation Advisory Panel, a UK government advisory body that considers claims relating to cultural objects lost during the Nazi era (1933–45) that are now held in UK national collections.

She serves on the steering committees of two research projects that apply the concept of epistemic injustice: EPIC (Epistemic Injustice in Healthcare), a Wellcome-funded collaboration between the universities of Bristol, Nottingham and Birmingham, and Credible Witnesses, an AHRC-funded project on young people, performance and testimonial injustice.

== Philosophy ==
=== Epistemic Injustice: Power and the Ethics of Knowing ===
Fricker put forward the theory of epistemic injustice in her 2007 book Epistemic Injustice: Power and the Ethics of Knowing, in which she originated the concepts of "epistemic injustice", "testimonial injustice", "hermeneutical marginalization" and "hermeneutical injustice".

Testimonial injustice is a deficit of credibility caused by any kind of prejudice affecting judgement of the hearer. Hermeneutical injustice is a deficit of intelligibility caused by "hermeneutical marginalization", which happens when a lack of social power causes a group to under-contribute to the generation of shared meanings. Both kinds of epistemic injustice permit "incidental" cases—where the prejudice or hermeneutical marginalization respectively affects a relatively localized area of the person's social activity; and "systematic" cases, where the effect is on a wider range of social activity. Only systematic epistemic injustices form part of the wider picture of a person's susceptibility to social injustices more generally. For this reason, systematic cases are viewed as "core" from the point of view of the project of the book, though the intrinsic epistemic wrong that is done is constant through all cases.

=== Blame and forgiveness ===
Fricker's work on blame and forgiveness uses a philosophical methodology she calls "paradigm-based explanation", which is a quasi-genealogical approach to moral phenomena whose most interesting or explanatorily powerful features may not be necessary conditions. The paradigm case is identified by asking what positive moral role is played in our lives by blaming or forgiving, and the functional role emerges as a unifying factor for morally positive cases.

=== Other aspects ===
She has also written extensively on the ethical philosophy of Bernard Williams, the subject of both her 2024 Whitehead Lectures at Harvard and her forthcoming 2027 Berkeley Tanner Lectures, the latter examining the idea of "origins" in his thought.

== Works ==
=== Books ===
- Reading Ethics: Selected Texts with Interactive Commentary, co-authored with Samuel Guttenplan (Wiley-Blackwell, 2009)
- Epistemic Injustice: Power and the Ethics of Knowing (Oxford University Press, 2007)

=== Edited collections ===
- Routledge Handbook of Social Epistemology, co-edited with Peter Graham, David Henderson & Nikolaj Pedersen (Routledge, 2019)
- The Epistemic Life of Groups: Essays in the Epistemology of Collectives, co-edited with Michael Brady (Oxford University Press, 2016)
- The Cambridge Companion to Feminism in Philosophy, co-edited with Jennifer Hornsby (Cambridge University Press, 2000)

=== Selected articles ===
- "Williams' 'Philosophical Anthropology': A Humean and Nietzschean Synergy", European Journal of Philosophy, Special Issue: Philosophy & History, eds. Wayne Martin, Andrew Norris & David Stern (online August 2025)
- "Strange Credibility: 'Avowal' as Functionally Factive Testimony", Jurisprudence: An International Journal of Legal and Political Thought 16, no. 1 (2025): 1–17
- "How Is Forgiveness Always a Gift?", Proceedings and Addresses of the American Philosophical Association 96 (November 2022): 21–53
- "Institutional Epistemic Vices: The Case of Inferential Inertia", in Heather Battaly, Quassim Cassam & Ian James Kidd (eds.), Epistemic Vice (Routledge, 2021): 89–107
- "Forgiveness: An Ordered Pluralism", Australasian Philosophical Review 3, no. 3 (2019): 241–260
- "Epistemic Injustice, Ignorance, and Trans Experiences", co-authored with Katharine Jenkins, in The Routledge Companion to Feminist Philosophy, eds. Garry, Khader & Stone (Routledge, 2017)
- "Epistemic Injustice and the Preservation of Ignorance", in The Epistemic Dimensions of Ignorance, eds. M. Blaauw & R. Peels (Cambridge University Press, 2016)
- "What's the Point of Blame? A Paradigm Based Explanation", Noûs 50, no. 1 (2016): 165–183
- "Epistemic Contribution as a Central Human Capability", in The Equal Society: Essays on Equality in Theory and Practice, ed. George Hull (Lexington Books, 2015)
- "Epistemic Justice as a Condition of Political Freedom", Synthese 190, no. 7 (2013): 1317–1332
- "Life-Story in Beauvoir's Memoirs", in The Cambridge Companion to Simone de Beauvoir, ed. Claudia Card (Cambridge University Press, 2003)
- "Epistemic Oppression and Epistemic Privilege", Canadian Journal of Philosophy, Supplementary Volume 25: Civilization and Oppression, ed. Catherine Wilson (1999): 191–210
- "Rational Authority and Social Power—Towards a Truly Social Epistemology", Proceedings of the Aristotelian Society 98, no. 2 (1998): 159–177

== Media appearances ==
- "'Trust has been so eroded': Miranda Fricker on epistemic injustice today", Perspective, France 24 (2026), a television interview on epistemic injustice in an age of misinformation
- "Miranda Fricker – Wissen und Macht", Sternstunde Philosophie, SRF (2023), an hour-long interview (in German)
- "Epistemic Injustice", Free Thinking, BBC Radio 3 (2021), a discussion with Havi Carel and Constantine Sandis
- "Forgiveness", The Philosopher's Zone, ABC Radio National (2018), an interview on blame and forgiveness
- "Moral Blame", The Philosopher's Arms, BBC Radio 4 (2013), on blame for historic wrongs
- "Hume and the Triumph of Reason", BBC Radio 4 (2011), marking the tercentenary of David Hume
- "The Atheist and the Bishop", BBC Radio 4 (2009), a dialogue with Richard Harries on suffering and death
- "Miranda Fricker on Epistemic Injustice", Philosophy Bites (2007), a podcast interview with Nigel Warburton
- Four editions of In Our Time, BBC Radio 4, on Virtue (2002), Pragmatism (2005), Altruism (2006) and Guilt (2007)
