= Agnès Carel =

French politician (born 1968)

Member of the National Assembly for Seine-Maritime's 7th constituency
- In office 5 August 2022 – 11 February 2024
- Preceded by: Agnès Firmin-Le Bodo
- Succeeded by: Agnès Firmin-Le Bodo

Personal details
- Born: 9 June 1968 (age 57) Drancy, France
- Political party: Horizons
- Children: 3
- Profession: Music teacher

Agnès Carel (born 9 June 1968) is a French politician of Horizons who served as a member of the National Assembly for Seine-Maritime's 7th constituency from 2022 to 2024. She was the substitute of Agnès Firmin-Le Bodo while she served in the Borne government.
