= Epistemic injustice =

Injustice related to knowledge

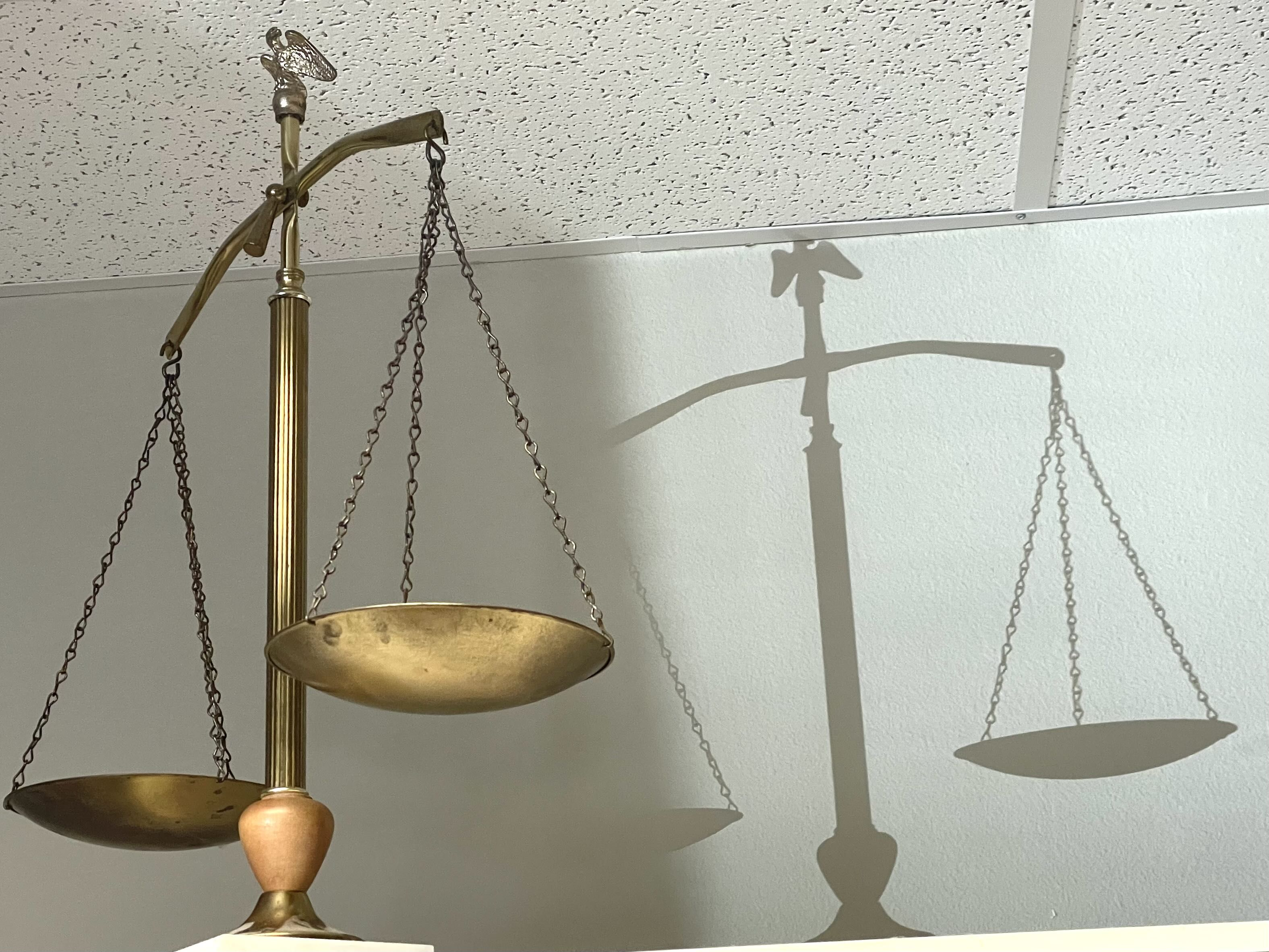

Epistemic injustice occurs when an individual or group is wronged in their "capacity as a knower", meaning that their ability to produce knowledge is called into question. The term was coined by British philosopher Miranda Fricker in 1998. In her book Epistemic Injustice: Power & the Ethics of Knowing, Fricker explains how socially privileged groups are given an "excess of credibility", meaning they are treated as the authority on their own experiences, but also those of others different from them. Conversely, oppressed groups experience a "credibility deficit", where they are regarded as unqualified to describe even their own experiences. The assignment of this credibility or lack thereof is often a result of existing systemic hierarchies and normative standards, both of which are often so deeply ingrained within societies that even members of marginalized groups may become convinced of its truth.

Epistemic injustice includes exclusion and silencing; systematic distortion or misrepresentation of one's meanings or contributions; undervaluing of one's status or standing in communicative practices; unfair distinctions in authority; and unwarranted distrust. According to Fricker, there are two kinds of epistemic injustice: testimonial injustice and hermeneutical injustice.

== Testimonial injustice ==
Testimonial injustice is unfairness related to trusting someone's word. An injustice of this kind can occur when someone is ignored, or not believed, because of their sex, sexuality, gender presentation, race, disability, or, broadly, because of their identity.

Miranda Fricker gives the example of Londoner Duwayne Brooks, who saw his friend Stephen Lawrence murdered. The police officers who arrived at the scene regarded Brooks with suspicion. According to an official inquiry, "the officers failed to concentrate upon Mr. Brooks and to follow up energetically the information which he gave them. Nobody suggested that he should accompany them in searches of the area, although he knew where the assailants had last been seen. Nobody appears properly to have tried to calm him, or to accept that what he said was true." That is, the police officers failed to view Brooks as a credible witness, presumably in part due to racial bias. This was, says Fricker, a case of testimonial injustice, which occurs when "prejudice causes a hearer to give a deflated level of credibility to a speaker's word."

== Hermeneutical injustice ==
The term hermeneutical means "relating to interpretation", and hermeneutical injustice makes someone less able to interpret their own life. Hermeneutical injustice occurs when someone's experiences are not well understood — by themselves or by others — because these experiences do not fit concepts that can be found in popular language. This is often due to the historic exclusion of some groups of people from activities, such as scholarship and journalism, that shape the language people use to make sense of their experiences.

For example, in the 1970s, the phrase sexual harassment was introduced to describe something that many people, especially women, had long experienced. Before this time, a woman experiencing sexual harassment may have had difficulty putting her experience into words. Fricker states that this difficulty is also not accidental, and was largely due to women's exclusion from shaping the English language and participating equally in journalism, publishing, academia, law, and the other institutions and industries that help people make sense of their lives. After the term sexual harassment was introduced, the same woman who experienced sexual harassment may have understood better what happened to her; however, she may have struggled to explain this experience to someone else, because the concept of sexual harassment was not yet well known.

Marginalized groups will often attempt to overcome the hermeneutical injustice that they face by creating hermeneutical resources to interpret their experiences and share their perspectives with more privileged groups. Philosopher Gaile Pohlhaus created the term "willful hermeneutical ignorance" to describe these cases. In her paper "Relational Knowing and Epistemic Injustice: Toward a Theory of "Willful Hermeneutical Ignorance", she explains how all humans are inherently interdependent and relationally situated in social and political life. She argues that there is collective knowledge shared by any community, and the members depend upon one another to contribute their own perspectives to ensure the accuracy of this knowledge. This collaboration is halted when more privileged members of the community leverage their social and political standing to deny marginalized groups from contributing to this collective knowledge. Pohlhaus argues that this denial can be intentional, and constitutes instances of willful hermeneutical injustice.

=== Willful hermeneutical injustice ===
Willful hermeneutical injustice can occur on an individual basis, however it can also become institutionalized in policy. For example, philosophers Henry Lara-Steidel and Winston C. Thompson argue that American laws that ban the teaching of "divisive concepts" such as Critical Race Theory in high schools constitutes willful hermeneutical injustice. In their paper "Epistemic injustice? Banning ‘critical race theory’, ‘divisive topics’, and ‘embedded racism’ in the classroom", they argue that the lessons that are prohibited under these laws were created in an effort to expand the hermeneutical resources and standards of credibility to include the perspectives and experiences of people of color and other marginalized groups. Therefore, they argue that the act of banning these resources from being taught constitutes willful ignorance from the privileged groups advocating for such laws.

== Misrepresentation of experiences ==
In cases where individuals or groups experience epistemic injustice, they are denied the ability to speak on their own behalf in a way that is deemed credible. As a result, their history and experiences will be shared by others that have been assigned epistemic authority, which is most often those that are socially and politically privileged. Philosopher Linda Martín Alcoff argues that this can be dangerous, as one's relation to the people for whom they are speaking will impact the way in which they view and represent them. In her paper "The Problem of Speaking for Others", she explains that when one speaks on behalf of a person, even including themselves, they are creating a representation of that person’s needs, desires, and overall self-conception. This representation rests upon the speaker’s interpretation of the experiences and characteristics of the person that is the subject of their speech, and the way that they advocate for such an individual will be inherently impacted by this interpretation.

While this interpretation may be inaccurate in many different cases of speaking for oneself or on behalf of others, Alcoff finds it imminently important to understand how instances of a socially and politically privileged group speaking on behalf of a marginalized group can be uniquely dangerous. In such situations, the marginalized group will often be misrepresented by the speakers, who will subconsciously perceive them as lesser in some way given their social positioning. Even in cases where the privileged individual considers themself an advocate for a group without the same privileges, their perspective on such a group will be largely mediated by their relative social positioning. Given how such privileged groups are most often the majority group, the representation of such a marginalized group that they may offer will be unable to be separated from their inability to fit within prevailing social norms, leaving them to be perpetually described by their "otherness" and its consequences.

Instances where privileged groups speak on behalf of marginalized groups can often lead to stereotyping, as the perceptions that these speakers share may depend upon the limited interactions that they have had with these groups. For example, there is a popular stereotype that conceives of all autistic individuals as possessing "savant" abilities. This perception is inaccurate to the experiences of every autistic individual, and can amount to harm for the community as a whole. While this stereotype may seem to paint autistic individuals in a positive light, its popularity often places pressure on autistic individuals to possess heightened abilities, and constructs the majority of the community who do not fit within this expectation as disappointing and worthy of stigma. This stereotype also reinforces the idea that autistic individuals may be seen as equal to their non-autistic counterparts only if they are able to compensate for the supposed ways that their autism makes them inherently inferior.

One area where epistemic injustice is especially dangerous is in lawmaking, specifically with policies that aim to solve a problem experienced by specific groups. For example, laws aiming to alleviate poverty most often depend upon how wealthy politicians perceive poverty and its causes. While these perceived causes may contribute to poverty, they mistakenly do not include the perspectives of individuals that are impoverished, making these laws less effective than they could be.

== Epistemological violence ==
Epistemological violence is distinct from epistemic injustice in that it usually occurs in the power structure of academic research, such as when interpreting empirical results in psychology. Epistemological violence is theoretical interpretations of empirical results that construct a targeted group as inferior, despite alternative and equally viable interpretations of the data.

For example, the psychologist Monique Botha has argued that academic studies of theory of mind in autistic children constitutes epistemological violence, due to foundational studies explicitly or implicitly drawing universal conclusions about the entire group of autistic people.

== Origins ==
Though the term epistemic injustice was not coined until 1998, earlier thinkers have discussed similar ideas.

Vivian May has argued that civil rights activist Anna Julia Cooper in the 1890s anticipated the concept in claiming that Black women are denied full and equal recognition as knowers.

Gaile Pohlhaus Jr. points to Gayatri Chakrovorty Spivak's 1988 essay "Can the Subaltern Speak?" as another anticipation. In that essay, Spivak describes what she calls epistemic violence occurring when subaltern persons are prevented from speaking for themselves about their own interests because of others claiming to know what those interests are.

== Further developments ==
Other scholars since Fricker have adapted the concept of epistemic injustice and/or expanded what the term includes. These contributions have included naming and narrowing down forms of epistemic injustice, such as epistemic oppression, epistemicide, epistemic exploitation, silencing as testimonial quieting and as testimonial smothering, contributory injustice, distributive epistemic injustice, epistemic trust injustice, and expressive hermeneutical injustice.

José Medina has advocated for an account of epistemic injustice that incorporates more voices and pays attention to context and the relationships at play. Elizabeth S. Anderson has argued that attention should be given to the structural causes and structural remedies of epistemic injustice. A closely related literature on epistemologies of ignorance has also been developing, which has included the identification of overlapping concepts such as white ignorance and willful hermeneutical ignorance.

American philosopher Kristie Dotson has warned that some definitions could leave out important contributions to the ongoing discussion around epistemic injustice. Gaile Pohlhaus Jr. has replied that the concept should therefore be considered an open one, and many different approaches to the concept should be considered.

The Routledge Handbook of Epistemic Injustice (2017) addressed both the theory of epistemic injustice and its application to practical case studies. The Indian political theorist Rajeev Bhargava has used the term epistemic injustice to describe how colonized groups were wronged when colonizing powers replaced, or negatively impacted, the concepts and categories that colonized groups used to understand themselves and the world. More recently, Sabelo Ndlovu-Gatsheni has used the terms epistemicide and cognitive empire to describe discrimination against scholars and intellectuals from the Global South.

More recently there has been proliferation of literature of epistemic injustice in the field of health and medicine, linking it with decolonization efforts - most prominent academics being Himani Bhakuni, Seye Abimbola and Soumyadeep Bhaumik . The nature and structure of epistemic injustice in the neglected tropical disease community has been described and calls for structural reforms, meta-research and health policy has been made. Robert Chapman, among others, has discussed the relationship between epistemic injustice and neurodiversity.

Genocide denial has been considered an example of epistemic injustice.

=== Silencing ===
Silencing, as practices caused by pernicious ignorance and leading to epistemic violence, is a concept proposed by Kristie Dotson. These practices take the forms of two distincts testimonial oppressions: testimonial smothering and testimonial quieting. First, testimonial smothering occurs when members of non-dominant groups withhold or alter what they communicate, anticipating that their ideas will be rejected or misinterpreted by members of dominant groups. Testimonial smothering occurs, for example, if a woman who has been the victim of sexist behavior at work refrains from speaking to her supervisor about it for fear that he will not take her seriously or dismiss her testimony. Testimonial quieting occurs when dominant groups, due to conscious or unconscious biases, fail to recognize certain marginalized individuals as knowledgeable sources or relevant participants and therefore exclude them from participating in relevant discussions. To return to the previous example, if a woman who has been the victim of a sexist act were to report sexist behavior in her workplace, only for her colleagues to subsequently organize a meeting about the work environment without inviting her, on the grounds that she is too personally involved, this would constitute a case of testimonial quieting.

== See also ==
=== Selected philosophers and theorists ===
- Miranda Fricker
- José Medina
- Kristie Dotson
- Elizabeth S. Anderson
- Charles Mills
- Boaventura de Sousa Santos
- Sabelo J. Ndlovu-Gatsheni

=== Related concepts ===
- Double empathy problem – Psychological theory regarding individuals on the autism spectrum
- Invisible disability – Disability that is not immediately noticeable to others
- Lived experience – Phenomenological concept
- Medical model of disability – Biomedical view of human disability
- Nothing about us without us – Political slogan originating in Central Europe
- Social model of disability – Societal failure to adapt to disabilities
- Victim blaming – Social phenomenon
