= Epistemicide =

Destruction of knowledge systems

Epistemicide is the destruction of knowledge systems, where episteme means knowledge. Epistemicide has been a part of colonialism, in which a coloniser destroys the existing knowledge systems of the colonised, to replace them with knowledge systems controlled by the coloniser. It is closely related to epistemic injustice. Cognitive justice seeks to challenge epistemicide.

The concept was developed by Boaventura de Sousa Santos in his 1998 La Globalización del derecho: los nuevos caminos de la regulación y la emancipación.

Ramón Grosfoguel has argued that epistemicide was an important part of European colonialism around the world—including in the Americas—whereby European philosophy had an "epistemic privilege" at the expense of other knowledge systems, becoming a "new foundation of knowledge in the modern/colonial world."

The term has been used to describe Israel's destruction of Palestinian knowledge systems, including its attacks on schools and universities. Rebecca Ruth Gould argues that "epistemicide exists in relation to genocide as scholasticide exists in relation to war: it attempts to erase not just educational institutions in their current state, but the very possibility of education in the future, in order to entirely erase the existence of a people from the Earth."
