= Agnès Firmin-Le Bodo =

French pharmacist and politician (born 1968)

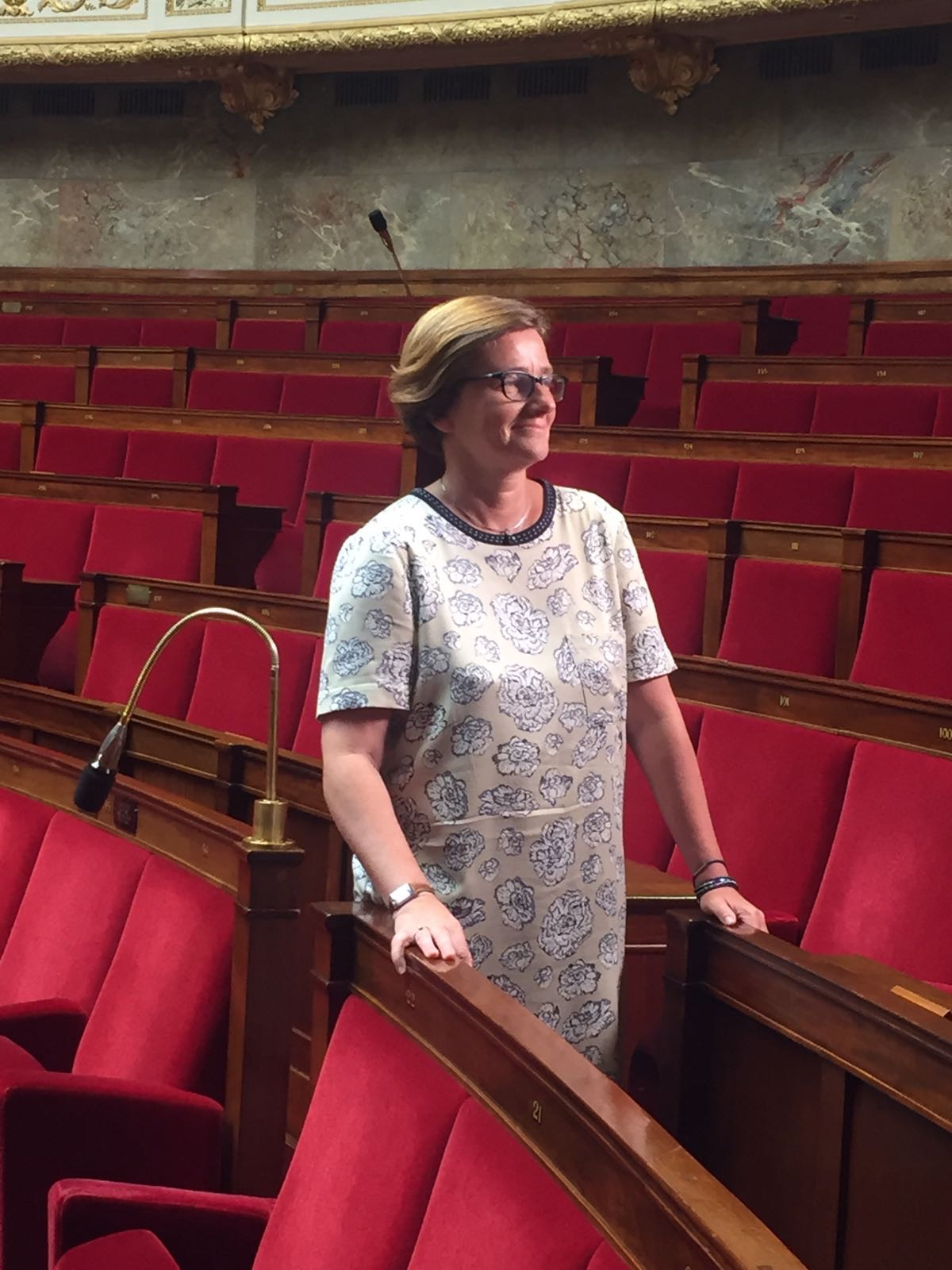
- Agnès Firmin-Le Bodo in 2017

Minister of Health and Prevention
- In office 20 December 2023 – 11 January 2024
- Prime Minister: Élisabeth Borne
- Preceded by: Aurélien Rousseau
- Succeeded by: Catherine Vautrin

Member of the National Assembly for Seine-Maritime's 7th constituency
- Incumbent
- Assumed office 12 February 2024
- Preceded by: Agnès Carel
- In office 21 June 2017 – 4 August 2022
- Preceded by: Jean-Louis Rousselin
- Succeeded by: Agnès Carel

Minister Delegate in charge of Territorial Organization and Health Profession
- In office 4 July 2022 – 20 December 2023
- Prime Minister: Élisabeth Borne
- Preceded by: Office established
- Succeeded by: Office abolished

President of the Cultural and Education Affairs Committee in the National Assembly
- In office 30 June 2022 – 6 July 2022
- Preceded by: Bruno Studer
- Succeeded by: Isabelle Rauch

Personal details
- Born: 20 November 1968 (age 57) Le Havre, France
- Party: Horizons (2021–present)
- Other political affiliations: RPR (until 2002); UMP (2002–2015); LR (2015–2017); Agir (2017–2022)
- Education: University of Rouen
- Profession: Pharmacist

Agnès Firmin-Le Bodo (French pronunciation: [aɲɛs fiʁmɛ̃ lə bɔdo]; born 20 November 1968) is a French pharmacist and politician of the Horizons party who briefly served as Minister of Health and Prevention in the government of Prime Minister Élisabeth Borne from 2023 to 2024. She was elected as a member of the National Assembly in the 2017 elections, representing the Seine-Maritime's 7th constituency.

== Political career ==
In November 2017, Firmin-Le Bodo left The Republicans (LR) and joined the new Agir party. In 2021, she also joined Horizons, the political party founded by former Prime Minister Édouard Philippe, and was appointed its spokeswoman in December 2021. Following Horizons' failed merger with Agir, she left the latter.

In parliament, Firmin-Le Bodo served on the Committee on Social Affairs. In addition to her committee assignments, she was part of the French-American Parliamentary Friendship Group and the French-Australian Parliamentary Friendship Group.

== Controversy ==
During the COVID-19 pandemic in France, Firmin-Le Bodo received death threats for her support of vaccine passports.

In late 2023, Firmin-Le Bodo is suspected of having failed to declare over €20,000 worth of undisclosed gifts — including watches, bottles of champagne, smartphones and a television — from Laboratoires Urgo between 2015 and 2020, when she was working as a pharmacist in Normandy, according to an investigation by French website Mediapart.
