= José Medina (philosopher) =

Spanish philosopher

José Medina is Walter Hill Scott professor of Philosophy at Northwestern University. He is a member of the American Philosophical Association, the British Wittgenstein Society, the North American Wittgenstein Society, the Society for the Advancement of American Philosophy, the Society for Phenomenology and Existential Philosophy (SPEP), the Southern Society for Philosophy and Psychology, and the Tennessee Philosophical Association.

== Education and career ==
He graduated in Philosophy from the University of Sevilla. José Medina received his MA and Ph.D. from Northwestern University. He was assistant professor at Saint Louis University (1998-1999), then worked at Vanderbilt University in the position of Assistant Professor (1999-2004), Associate Professor (2004-2012) and Professor (2012-2017), before joining Northwestern University in 2017. He was also International Chair of Excellence in the Humanities, Charles III University of Madrid (2011-2012).

== Research areas ==
His research focuses on critical race theory, gender and queer theory, philosophy of language, philosophy of mind, political philosophy, social epistemology, and 20th-century philosophy (European and American).

== Awards and fellowships ==
In 2013 Medina's book The Epistemology of Resistance: Gender and Racial Oppression, Epistemic Injustice, and Resistant Imagination was the winner of the 2012 North American Society for Social Philosophy Book Award.

== Books ==
- The Epistemology of Protest: Silencing, Epistemic Activism, and the Communicative Life of Resistance (Oxford, Oxford University Press, 2023) ISBN 9780197660904
- The Epistemology of Resistance: Gender and Racial Oppression, Epistemic Injustice, and Resistant Imaginations (Oxford, Oxford University Press, 2012) ISBN 0199929041
- Speaking from Elsewhere: A New Contextualist Perspective on Meaning, Identity and Discursive Agency (New York, SUNY Press, 2006) ISBN 0791469158
- Language: Key Concepts in Philosophy (London, Bloomsbury Academic, 2005) ISBN 0826471676
- The Unity of Wittgenstein's Philosophy: Necessity, Intelligibility, and Normativity (New York, SUNY Press, 2002) ISBN 079145388X

== Articles ==
- “Color-Blindness, Meta-Ignorance, and the Racial Imagination”, Critical Philosophy of Race (January 2013)
- “Hermeneutical Injustice and Polyphonic Contextualism: Social Silences and Shared Hermeneutical Responsibilities”, Social Epistemology 26 (2), (2012), 201-220.
- “Memoria, Objetividad, y Justicia: Hacia una Epistemología de la Resistencia”, La Balsa de la Medusa 4 (2011), 47-74.
- “Toward a Foucaultian Epistemology of Resistance: Counter-Memory, Epistemic Friction, and Guerrilla Pluralism”, Foucault Studies No. 12, (October 2011).
