= Havi Carel =

Israeli philosopher

Dr Havi Hannah Carel
- חוי כראל
- Born: 1971 (age 54–55)
- Occupation: Professor of Philosophy

Havi Hannah Carel (Hebrew: חוי כראל) is a professor of philosophy at the University of Bristol.

== Education and career ==
Carel studied for a BA and MA at Tel-Aviv University and was awarded her PhD by the University of Essex. She was lecturer at the University of the West of England then moved to the University of Bristol as a senior lecturer and was later promoted to professor. Carel also teaches at the Bristol Medical School.

Her research interests include: philosophy of medicine, phenomenology, philosophy of death, epistemic injustice and health, illness in children, and film and philosophy. Carel is best-known for her work on the phenomenology of somatic illness, and has led AHRC-funded projects on concepts of health, illness, and disease (2009–11), a Leverhulme Trust-funded the lived experience of illness (2011–12), a British Academy Mid-Career Fellowship (2012–13) and recently completed a five-year Wellcome Trust Senior Investigator Award funded project, 'The Life of Breath' She employs film in teaching and has co-edited a volume entitled New Takes in Film-Philosophy.

In 2006, Carel was diagnosed with lymphangioleiomyomatosis, a very rare life-limiting lung disease, and much of her academic work reflects her own lived experiences as an ill person.

== Selected writings ==
=== Monographs ===
- Phenomenology of Illness (Oxford: Oxford University Press, 2018).
- Life and Death in Freud and Heidegger (Amsterdam: Rodopi 2014).
- Illness: The Cry of the Flesh, 2nd ed. (London: Routledge, 2013).
- Illness: The Cry of the Flesh, 1st ed. (Durham: Acumen, 2008).

=== Edited volumes ===
- Human Nature and Experience, co-edited with Darian Meacham (Cambridge: Cambridge University Press, 2013).
- Health, Illness, and Disease: Philosophical Essays, co-edited with Rachel Cooper (Durham: Acumen, 2012).
- New Takes in Film-Philosophy, co-edited with Greg Tuck (Basingstoke: Palgrave MacMillan, 2010).*What Philosophy Is, co-edited with David Gamez (London" Continuum, 2004)

=== Selected journal articles and book chapters ===
- "Healthcare Practice, Epistemic Injustice, and Naturalism", with Ian James Kidd, in S Barker, C Crerar, and T Goetz (eds.), Harms and Wrongs in Epistemic Practice (Cambridge: Cambridge University Press, 2019).
- "Chronic breathlessness: re-thinking the symptom", with J. Macnaughton, R Oxley, A Russell, A Rose, J Dodd, European Respiratory Journal, (2018).
- "Breathlessness: The rift between objective measurement and subjective experience", Lancet Respiratory Medicine 6. (2018): 332-333.
- "Breathlessness: An invisible symptom", in Lenart Škof and Petri Berndtson (eds.), Atmospheres of Breathing: The Respiratory Questions of Philosophy (New York: SUNY Press, 2018), 364-382.
- "Breathlessness: From bodily symptom to existential experience", with T. Williams, in Kevin Aho (eds) Existential Medicine: Essays on Health and Illness (New York: Rowman & Littlefield, 2018).
- "Review of The Distressed Body by Drew Leder", The Journal of Medicine and Philosophy 43 (2018): 361-367,
- "Stigma, technology and masking: Hearing aids and ambulatory oxygen", with C. McGuire in David Wasserman and Adam Cureton (eds.) Oxford Handbook of the Philosophy of Disability (Oxford: Oxford University Press, 2018).
- "Even Ethics Professors fail to return library books", Philosophy, Psychiatry & Psychology 24 (2018): 211-213.
- "Virtue in deficit: the 9-year-old hero", Lancet 389 (2017: 1094-1095.
- "Epistemic Injustice and Illness", with Ian James Kidd, Journal of Applied Philosophy, 34 (2017): 172-190.
- "Epistemic Injustice in Healthcare Encounters: Evidence from Chronic Fatigue Syndrome", with C. Blease and K. Geraghty, Journal of Medical Ethics, 43 (2017): 549-557.
- "Virtue without Excellence, Excellence without Health", Aristotelian Society Supplementary Volume, 90 (2016): 237-253.
- ""If I Had to Live Like You, I Think I'd Kill Myself": Social Dimensions of the Experience of Illness", in D. Moran and T. Szanto (eds.), Phenomenology of Sociality: Discovering the "We" (London: Routledge, 2016), 173-186.
- "Invisible Suffering: Breathlessness in and Beyond the Clinic", with J. Macnaughton and J. Dodd, Lancet Respiratory Medicine, 3 (2015): 278-279.
- "Epistemic Injustice in Healthcare: A Philosophical Analysis", with Ian James Kidd, Medicine, Healthcare, and Philosophy, 17 (2014): 529-540.
- "Seen But Not Heard: Children and Epistemic Injustice", with G. Gyorffy, Lancet, 384 (2014): 1256-1257.
- "Bodily Doubt", Journal of Consciousness Studies, 20 (2013): 178-197.
