= Journal of Higher Education Outreach and Engagement =

- Discipline: Public service, higher education
- Language: English

Publication details
- Former names: Journal of Public Service and Outreach
- History: 1996-present
- Publisher: University of Georgia
- Frequency: Quarterly
- Open access: Yes

Standard abbreviations
- ISO 4: J. High. Educ. Outreach Engagem.

Indexing
- ISSN: 1534-6102
- LCCN: 2001233586
- OCLC no.: 46439834

Links
- Journal homepage; Online access; Online archive

The Journal of Higher Education Outreach and Engagement is a peer-reviewed open-access academic journal published by the University of Georgia. It was established in 1996 as the Journal of Public Service and Outreach. The journal covers issues concerning service learning and university outreach to surrounding communities. The journal publishes research articles, essays, descriptions of nascent university-community partnership projects, book reviews, and dissertation overviews.
