= Seine-Maritime's 7th constituency =

Constituency of the National Assembly of France

7th constituency of Seine-Maritime
- inline Constituency of the National Assembly of France
- Deputy: Agnès Firmin-Le Bodo; H
- Department: Seine-Maritime

The 7th constituency of Seine-Maritime is a French legislative constituency in the department of Seine-Maritime. Like the other 576 French constituencies, it elects one MP using the two-round system, with a run-off if no candidate receives over 50% of the vote in the first round.

== Description ==
The constituency contains the coastal areas, and the northern suburbs of Le Havre. The southeastern part of the city is covered by Seine-Maritime's 8th constituency.

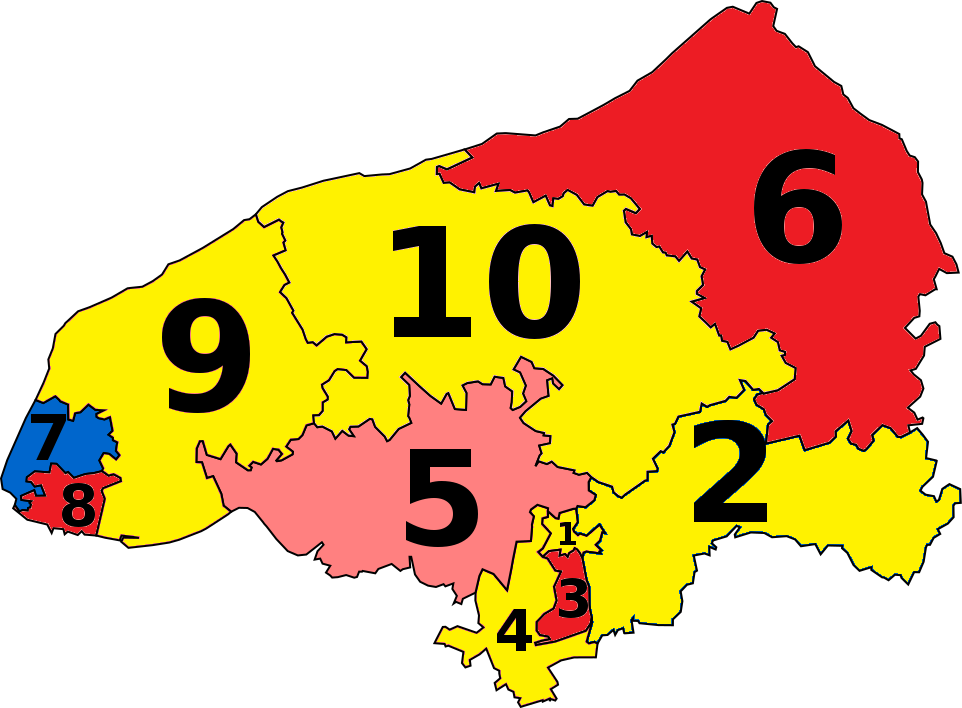
The map shows the 2nd round results at the 2017 election. The constituency is numbered 7.

== Historic representation ==
Election	Member	Party
1958	René Cance	PCF
1962	René Cance	PCF
1967	André Duroméa	PCF
1968	André Duroméa	PCF
1973	André Duroméa	PCF
1978	André Duroméa	PCF
1981	André Duroméa	PCF
1986	Proportional representation – no election by constituency	
1988	Antoine Rufenacht	RPR
1993	Antoine Rufenacht	RPR
1997	Jean-Yves Besselat	RPR
2002	Jean-Yves Besselat	UMP
2007	Jean-Yves Besselat	UMP
2012	Édouard Philippe	UMP
2012	Édouard Philippe	UMP
2017	Agnès Firmin-Le Bodo	LR
2017	Agnès Firmin-Le Bodo	Agir
2021	Agnès Firmin-Le Bodo	H
2022	Agnès Firmin-Le Bodo	H

== Election results ==
=== 2024 ===
Legislative Election 2024: Seine-Maritime's 7th constituency
Party	Candidate	Votes	%	±%
HOR (Ensemble)	Agnès Firmin Le Bodo	19,734	34.83	−4.30
PS (NFP)	Florence Martin Péréon	16,211	28.62	N/A
REC	Isabelle Ducoeurjoly	553	0.98	−2.43
DIV	Véronique de la Brosse	541	0.95	N/A
LR	Jacques Forestier	1,489	2.63	−1.53
RN	Anaïs Thomas	16,221	28.63	+13.33
LO	Jean-Paul Macé	610	1.08	N/A
DIV	Catherine Omont	1,292	2.28	N/A
Turnout		56,651	97.36	+50.30
Registered electors		85,533		
2nd round result
HOR	Agnès Firmin-Le Bodo	36,050	66.18	+8.31
RN	Anaïs Thomas	18,423	33.82	N/A
Turnout		54,473	94.35	+48.43
Registered electors		85,544		
HOR hold		Swing		

=== 2022 ===
Legislative Election 2022: Seine-Maritime's 7th constituency
Party	Candidate	Votes	%	±%
HOR (Ensemble)	Agnès Firmin-Le Bodo	15,505	39.13	N/A
LFI (NUPÉS)	Nancy Duboc	10,304	26.00	-2.84
RN	Lucie Delestre	6,064	15.30	+3.44
LR (UDC)	Jacques Forestier	1,648	4.16	−28.98
DVE	Alexis Deck	1,450	3.66	N/A
REC	Frédéric Groussard	1,351	3.41	N/A
Others	N/A	3,305		
Turnout		40,844	47.06	−0.13
2nd round result
HOR (Ensemble)	Agnès Firmin-Le Bodo	21,578	57.87	N/A
LFI (NUPÉS)	Nancy Duboc	15,709	42.13	N/A
Turnout		37,287	45.92	−1.27
HOR gain from LR				

=== 2017 ===
Legislative Election 2017: Seine-Maritime's 7th constituency
Party	Candidate	Votes	%	±%
LR	Agnès Firmin-Le Bodo	13,270	33.14	
DVG	Antoine Siffert	6,971	17.41	
LFI	Gérald Maniable	5,537	13.83	
FN	Stéphanie Ferrand	4,749	11.86	
PS	Matthieu Brasse	2,861	7.14	
EELV	Alexis Deck	1,600	4.00	
PCF	Baptiste Bauza	1,548	3.87	
DVD	Hervé Drieu	802	2.00	
Others	N/A	2,710		
Turnout		41,352	47.19	
2nd round result
LR	Agnès Firmin-Le Bodo	17,267	61.92	
DVG	Antoine Siffert	10,617	38.08	
Turnout		32,482	37.07	
LR hold		Swing		

=== 2012 ===
2012 legislative election in Seine-Maritime's 7th constituency
Candidate	Party	First round		Second round	
Candidate	Party	Votes	%	Votes	%
Édouard Philippe	UMP	18,963	39.12%	24,452	50.81%
Laurent Logiou	PS	16,640	34.33%	23,677	49.19%
Angélique Idczak	FN	5,719	11.80%		
Nathalie Nail	FG	4,446	9.17%		
Marie-Hélène Boileau	EELV	1,152	2.38%		
Thierry Delpeches	DVG	850	1.75%		
Marie-Hélène Duverger	NPA	193	0.40%		
Juliette Plouin	LO	162	0.33%		
Nathalie Perret	PPLD	142	0.29%		
François Cheverry	SP	135	0.28%		
Ousmane Sow	SE	66	0.14%		
Valid votes		48,468	98.54%	48,129	97.36%
Spoilt and null votes		719	1.46%	1,305	2.64%
Votes cast / turnout		49,187	55.11%	49,434	55.57%
Abstentions		40,067	44.89%	39,520	44.43%
Registered voters		89,254	100.00%	88,954	100.00%

=== 2007 ===
Legislative Election 2007: Seine-Maritime's 7th constituency
Party	Candidate	Votes	%	±%
UMP	Jean-Yves Besselat	16,033	48.04	
PS	Laurent Logiou	7,485	22.43	
MoDem	Marc Migraine	3,296	9.88	
PCF	Myriam Argentin	1,557	4.67	
LV	Annie Leroy	1,283	3.84	
FN	Françoise Vallin	1,243	3.72	
Far left	François Leroux	1,052	3.15	
Others	N/A	1,427		
Turnout		34,107	57.64	
2nd round result
UMP	Jean-Yves Besselat	18,154	56.39	
PS	Laurent Logiou	14,039	43.61	
Turnout		33,271	56.23	
UMP hold				

=== 2002 ===
Legislative Election 2002: Seine-Maritime's 7th constituency
Party	Candidate	Votes	%	±%
UMP	Jean-Yves Besselat	16,371	46.38	
PS	Viviane Simon	9,271	26.27	
FN	Andre Foucher	3,991	11.31	
LV	Annie Leroy	1,561	4.42	
LCR	Francois Leroux	962	2.73	
Others	N/A	3,139		
Turnout		35,863	61.55	
2nd round result
UMP	Jean-Yves Besselat	19,428	59.44	
PS	Viviane Simon	13,258	40.56	
Turnout		33,717	57.87	
UMP hold				

=== 1997 ===
Legislative Election 1997: Seine-Maritime's 7th constituency
Party	Candidate	Votes	%	±%
RPR	Jean-Yves Besselat	12,455	34.07	
PS	Viviane Simon	8,139	22.26	
FN	Daniel Blot	6,087	16.65	
PCF	Nathalie Nail	4,300	11.76	
LV	Franck Nicolon	1,624	4.44	
GE	Magali La Meur	1,395	3.82	
DVD	François Quinart	1,290	3.53	
Others	N/A	1,268		
Turnout		37,881	63.21	
2nd round result
RPR	Jean-Yves Besselat	20,152	52.37	
PS	Viviane Simon	18,331	47.63	
Turnout		40,542	67.69	
RPR hold				
