= Carels =

Carels is a surname. Notable people with the surname include:

- Carson Carels (born 2008), Canadian ice hockey player
- Laurentius Carels, Swedish Lutheran clergyman and American settler

== See also ==
- Carel
