= Kristie Dotson =

Professor Kristie Dotson
- Education: University of Memphis
- Occupation: Professor of Philosophy
- Employer: University of Michigan
- Known for: Specialises in epistemology, metaphilosophy, and black feminist philosophy.

Kristie Dotson is a professor of philosophy at the University of Michigan. Her work specialises in epistemology, metaphilosophy, and black feminist philosophy.

== Education and career ==
Dotson studied for her PhD in Philosophy at the University of Memphis in 2008. She currently works as University Diversity and Social Transformation Professor of Philosophy and Afroamerican and African Studies at the University of Michigan-Ann Arbor.

Her research explores the intersections of epistemology and women of color feminism, particularly Black feminism.

In 2014, Dotson also edited a special issue on women of color feminist philosophy for Hypatia: A Journal of Feminist Philosophy.

== Selected works ==
- A Cautionary Tale: On Limiting Epistemic Oppression, University of Nebraska Press (2012) Frontiers Vol.33 (1), p. 24-47.
- Conceptualizing Epistemic Oppression, Social Epistemology (2014), Volume 28, Issue 2, p. 115-138.
- Tracking Epistemic Violence, Tracking Practices of Silencing (2011).
