= Mira, Portugal =

Mira
- Municipality
- Town of Mira
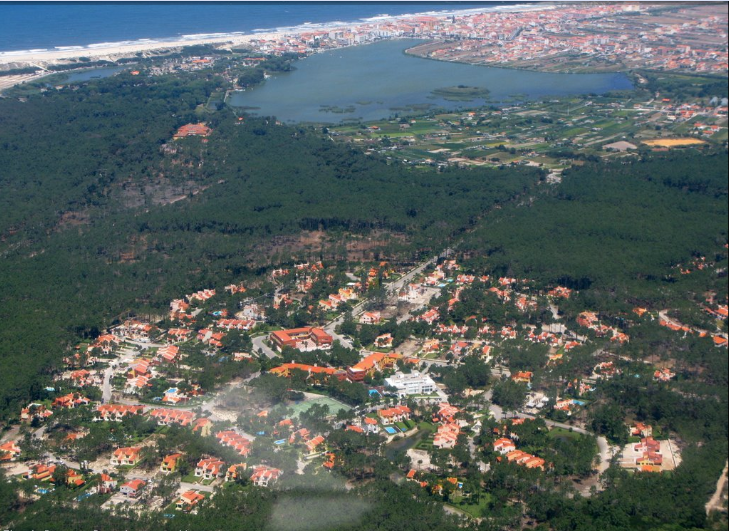
- A view of the municipal seat of Mira

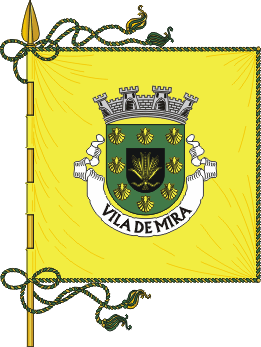
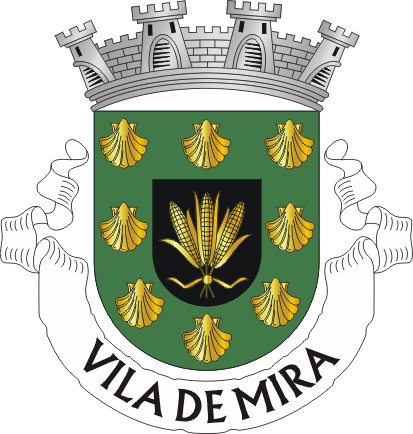
- Flag Coat of arms
- Interactive map of Mira
- Location in Portugal
- Coordinates: 40°26′N 8°44′W
- Country: Portugal
- Region: Centro
- Intermunic. comm.: Região de Coimbra
- District: Coimbra
- Parishes: 4

Area
  - Total: 124.03 km^{2} (47.89 sq mi)

Population (2011)
  - Total: 12,465
  - Density: 100.50/km^{2} (260.29/sq mi)
- Time zone: UTC+00:00 (WET)
  - Summer (DST): UTC+01:00 (WEST)
- Website: www.cm-mira.pt

Mira (Portuguese pronunciation: [ˈmiɾɐ]), officially the Town of Mira (Portuguese: Vila de Mira), is a municipality in the central Portuguese district of Coimbra. A coastal municipality, known for its beaches, forests, and agriculture, the population was 12 465 inhabitants in an area of approximately 124.03 square kilometres (47.89 mi^{2}).

== History ==
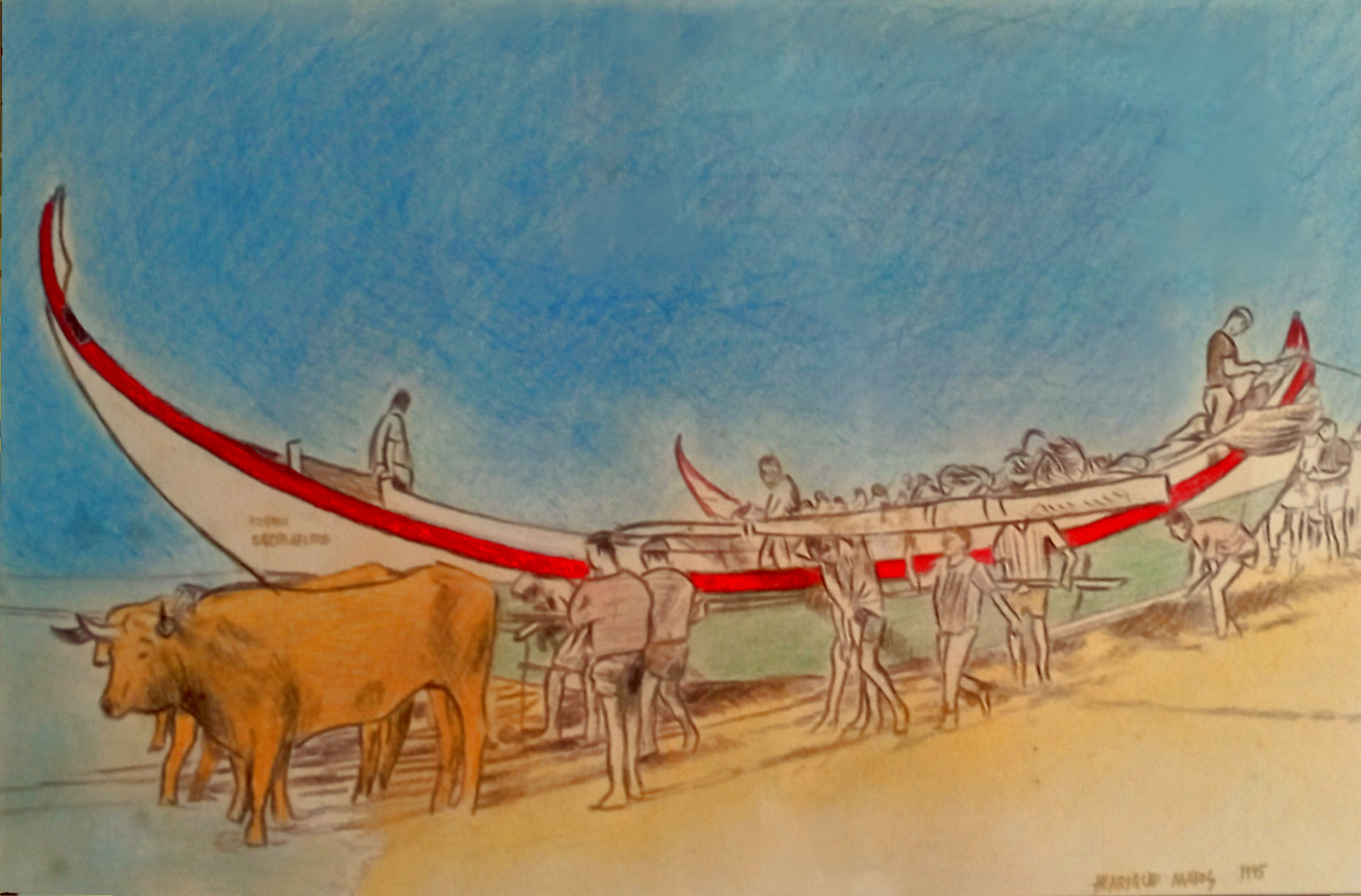
A drawing showing the economic life of Praia de Mira

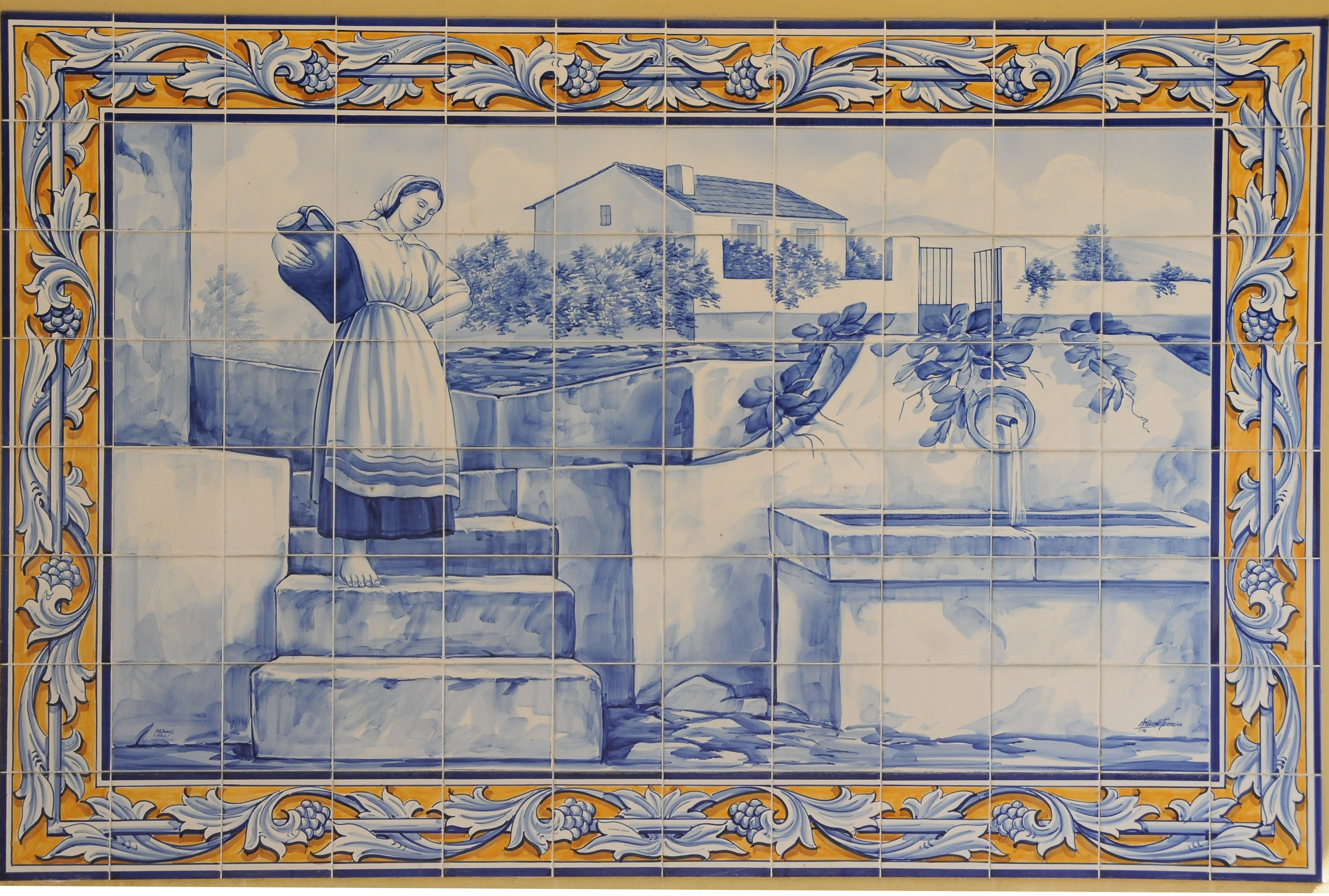
Azulejo showing a maiden collecting water from the fountain of São Bento

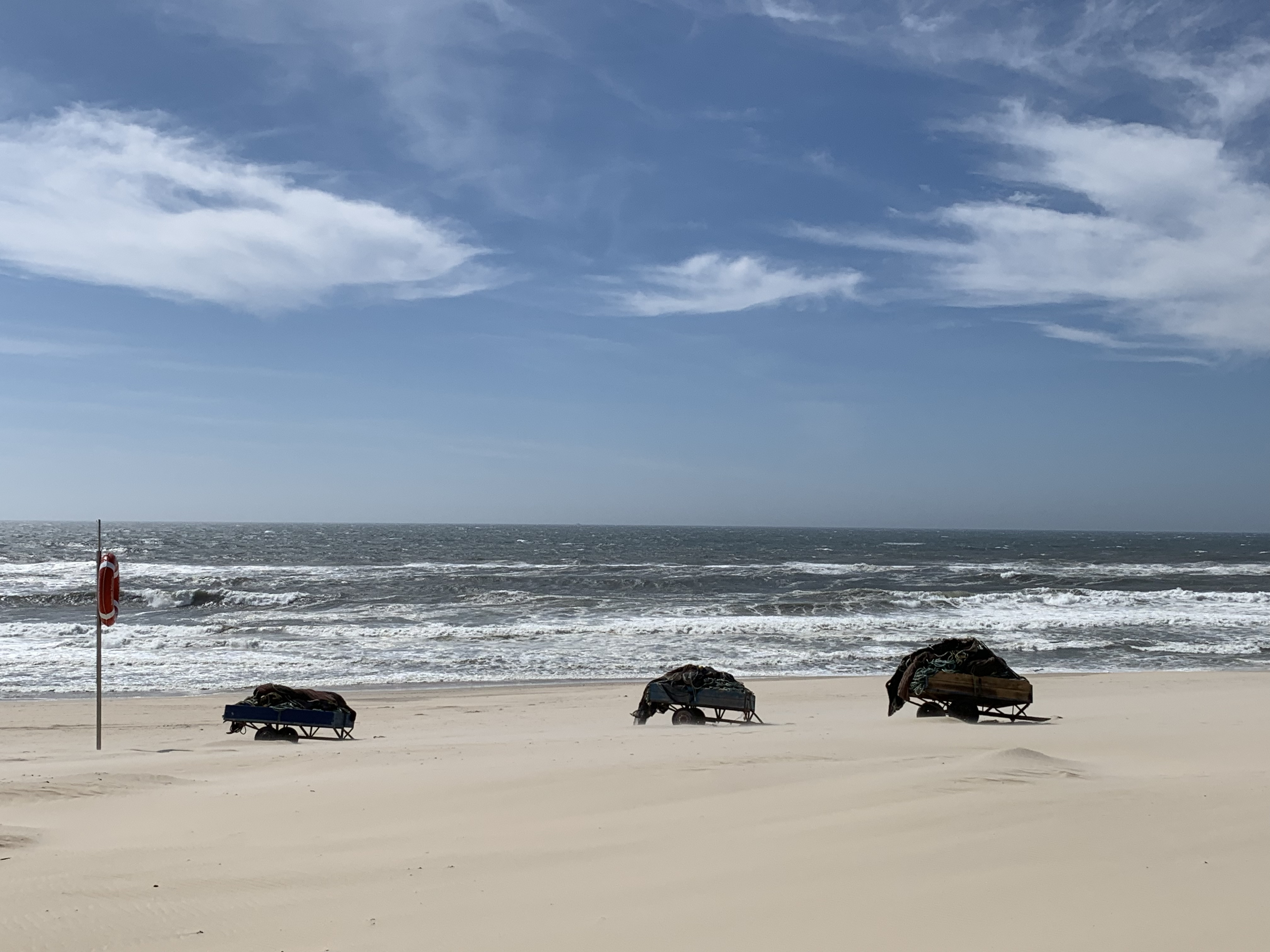
Beach of Mira

In 1442, the regent Peter, Duke of Coimbra, conceded administrative autonomy to the town of Mira.

Concession of its first Foral (charter) occurred almost a century later, during the reign of King D. Manuel I. At that time, on 28 August 1514, the king bestowed to Gonçalo Tavares, the first seigneur of Mira, privileges to develop the region.

In 1644, by royal concession, King D. John IV of Portugal transfer donatário title to the Casa da Rainha referring to the older concession, bestowed further rights to his successor, Manuel de Sousa Tavares (from the 1758 Memórias Paroquiais).

Mira was integrated in to the bishopric and comarca of Coimbra in 1758.

== Geography ==
Administratively, the municipality is divided into 4 civil parishes (freguesias):

- Mira
- Praia de Mira
- Seixo
- Carapelhos

== Economy ==
A centre for artisanal fishery, and aquaculture, Mira's economic activities also rely on agriculture, forestry and tourism.

In 2007, the Galician fishing company Pescanova, headquartered in Redondela, Spain, announced its intention to build several sea bass aquaculture plants in Mira. Pescanova invested about 350 million Euros in the Portuguese aquaculture plant, which was backed by the Portuguese government with about 45 million Euros in incentives. The plants incorporate wind farms to alleviate the high energy costs, as well as a fish feeding plant. The plants were projected to reach a production rate of between 30,000 and 100,000 tonnes per year.

== Architecture ==
=== Civic ===
- Building of the Post, Telegraph and Telephones (CTT) of Mira (Portuguese: Edifício dos Correios, Telégrafos e Telefones, CTT, de Mira)
- Fountain of São Bento (Portuguese: Fonte de São Bento)
- Municipal Council and Judicial Courthouse of Mira (Portuguese: Câmara Municipal e Tribunal Judicial de Mira)
- Pillory of Mira (Portuguese: Pelourinho de Mira)
- Subregional Hospital of Mira (Portuguese: Hospital Subregional de Mira)

=== Religious ===
- Chapel of Leitões (Portuguese: Capela de Leitões)
- Chapel of Nossa do Carmo (Portuguese: Capela de Nossa do Carmo)
- Chapel of Nossa Senhora da Conceição (Portuguese: Capela de Nossa Senhora da Conceição)
- Chapel of Santa Marinha (Portuguese: Capela de Santa Marinha)
- Chapel of São Sebastião (Portuguese: Capela de São Sebastião)
- Church of São Tomé (Portuguese: Igreja Paroquial de Mira/Igreja de São Tomé)
- Church of Nossa Senhora do Carmo (Portuguese: Igreja Paroquial de Seixo/Igreja de Nossa Senhora do Carmo)
- Hermitage of Santa Maria de Mira (Portuguese: Ermida Santa Maria de Mira)

== Notable people ==
- Isabel Capeloa Gil (born 1965 in Mira) the 6th Rector of the Catholic University of Portugal
