= Boaventura de Sousa Santos =

Portuguese sociologist

Boaventura de Sousa Santos GOSE
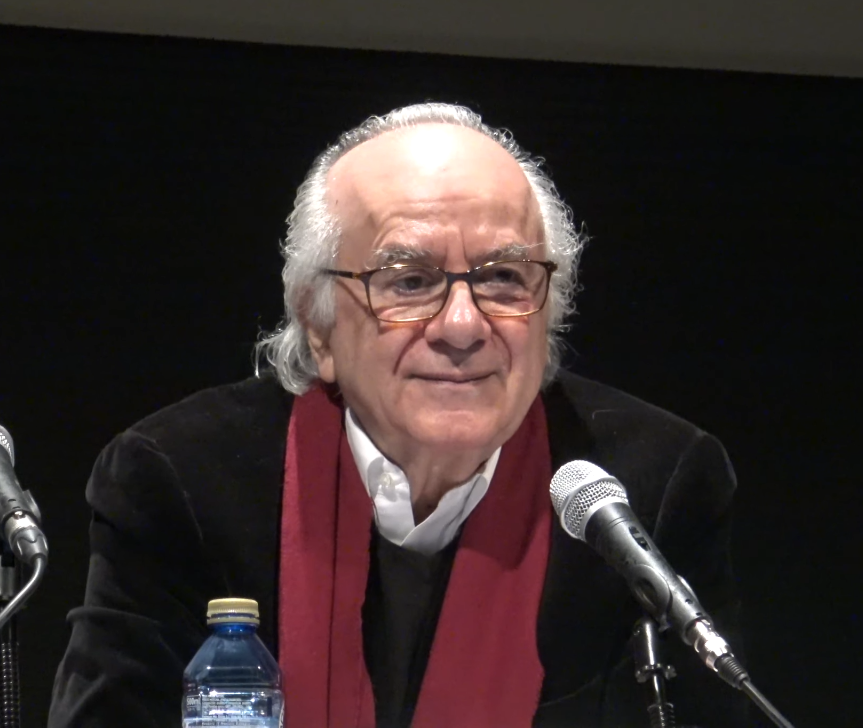
- Sousa Santos in 2019
- Born: 15 November 1940 (age 85); Coimbra, Portugal
- Education: University of Coimbra; Yale University
- Employer: University of Coimbra
- Known for: Sociology of absences
- Spouse: Maria Irene Ramalho
- Awards: Frantz Fanon Lifetime Achievement 2022
- Honours: Military Order of Saint James of the Sword
- Website: https://www.boaventurasantos.com/

Boaventura de Sousa Santos (born 15 November 1940) is a Portuguese sociologist, professor emeritus at the Department of Sociology of the School of Economics of the University of Coimbra (FEUC), Distinguished Legal Scholar at the University of Wisconsin-Madison Law School, and director emeritus of the Centre for Social Studies at the University of Coimbra. An outspoken sympathizer and avowed supporter of the Bloco de Esquerda party, he is regarded as one of the most prominent Portuguese living left-wing intellectuals.

== Early life ==
Boaventura de Sousa Santos was born on November 15, 1940, in Coimbra, Portugal. His paternal grandparents lived in a small village of São Pedro de Alva, in the municipality of Penacova, 30 km away from Coimbra, where they had a house and farmland employed on the cultivation of corn and potatoes as well as olive orchards and livestock.

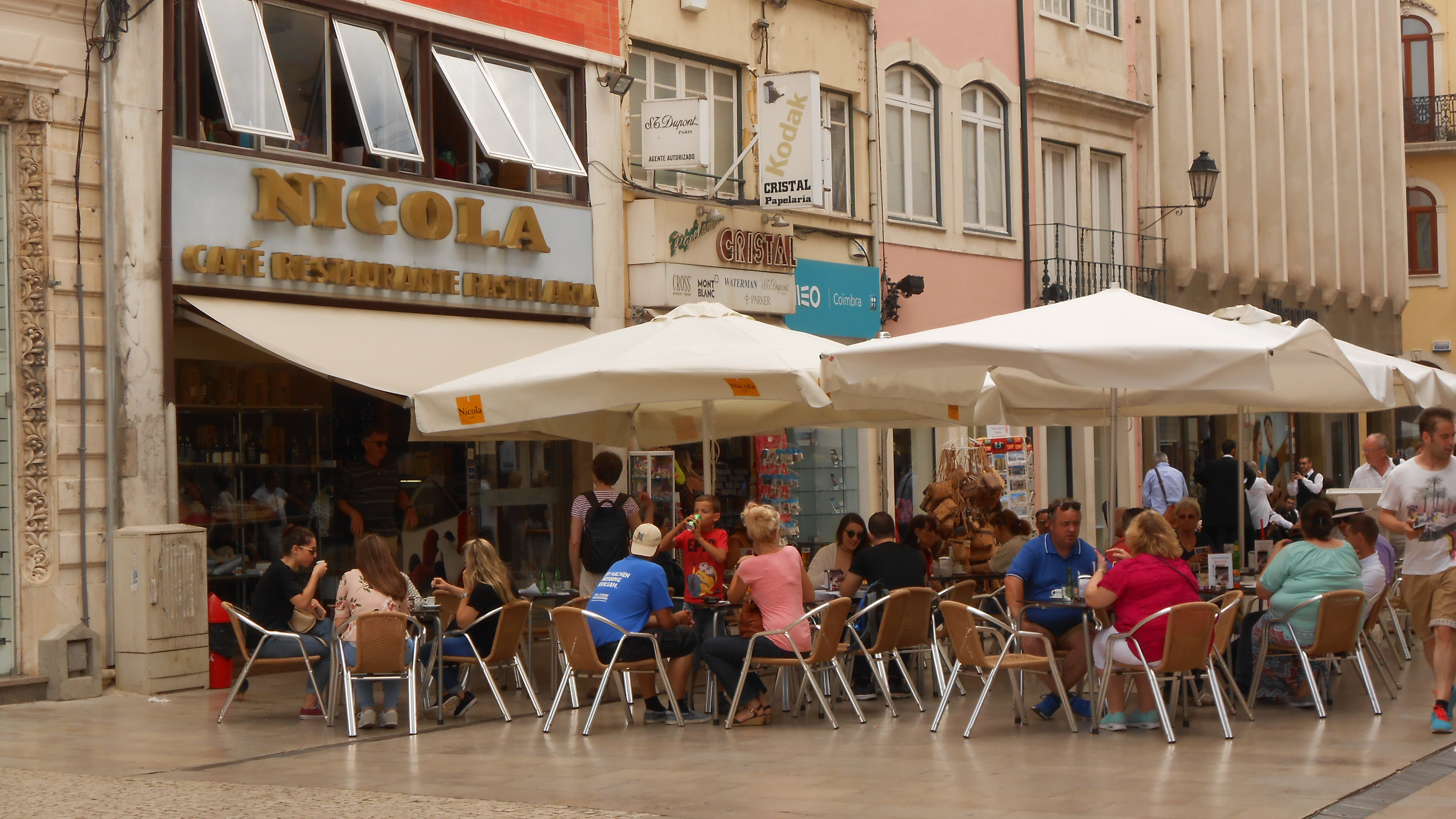
Nicola café and restaurant in Ferreira Borges Street, Coimbra, Portugal.

His father was born in that very house. During school holidays, Boaventura de Sousa Santos spent long periods at his grandparents’ estate, where he helped with agricultural tasks and played with children from the surrounding area. An only child, he lived in the city of Coimbra with his parents. His father worked as a chef in the prestigious restaurant "Nicola" in the downtown of Coimbra, which was frequented by members of the city's academia.

== Career ==
He earned his undergraduate degree in law from the University of Coimbra in 1963 and in 1965 a post-graduate diploma in jurisprudence in West Berlin at the Free University of Berlin. He went on to pursue a doctorate on the sociology of law at Yale University from 1969 to 1973. In 1973, he became one of the co-founders of the School of Economics of the University of Coimbra (FEUC), where he opened a sociology course. In 1978, he also founded the Centre for Social Studies at the University of Coimbra (Centro de Estudos Sociais). In the mid-1980s, he began to structurally adopt the role of a researcher whose understanding of the world extended beyond a Western perspective. He was a Global Legal Scholar at the University of Warwick and visiting professor at Birkbeck College, University of London and has been involved in research in Brazil, Cabo Verde, Macau, Mozambique, South Africa, Colombia, Bolivia, Ecuador and India.

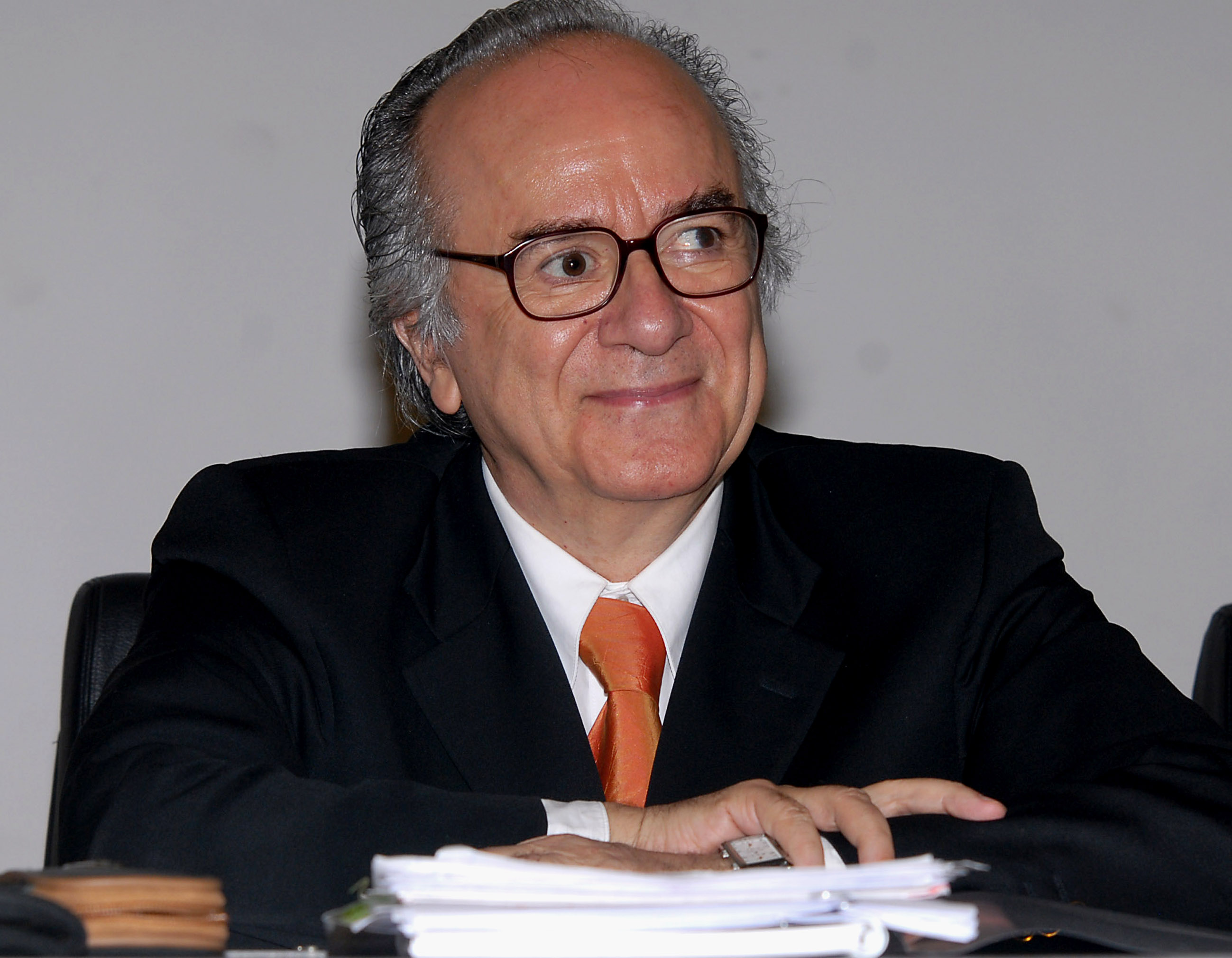
Boaventura de Sousa Santos in 2007.

He has travelled widely, giving classes and lectures. He was one of the driving forces behind the World Social Forum, the spirit of which he considers essential to his studies of counter-hegemonic globalization and to promoting the struggle for global cognitive justice, an underlying concept of “Epistemologies of the South.”

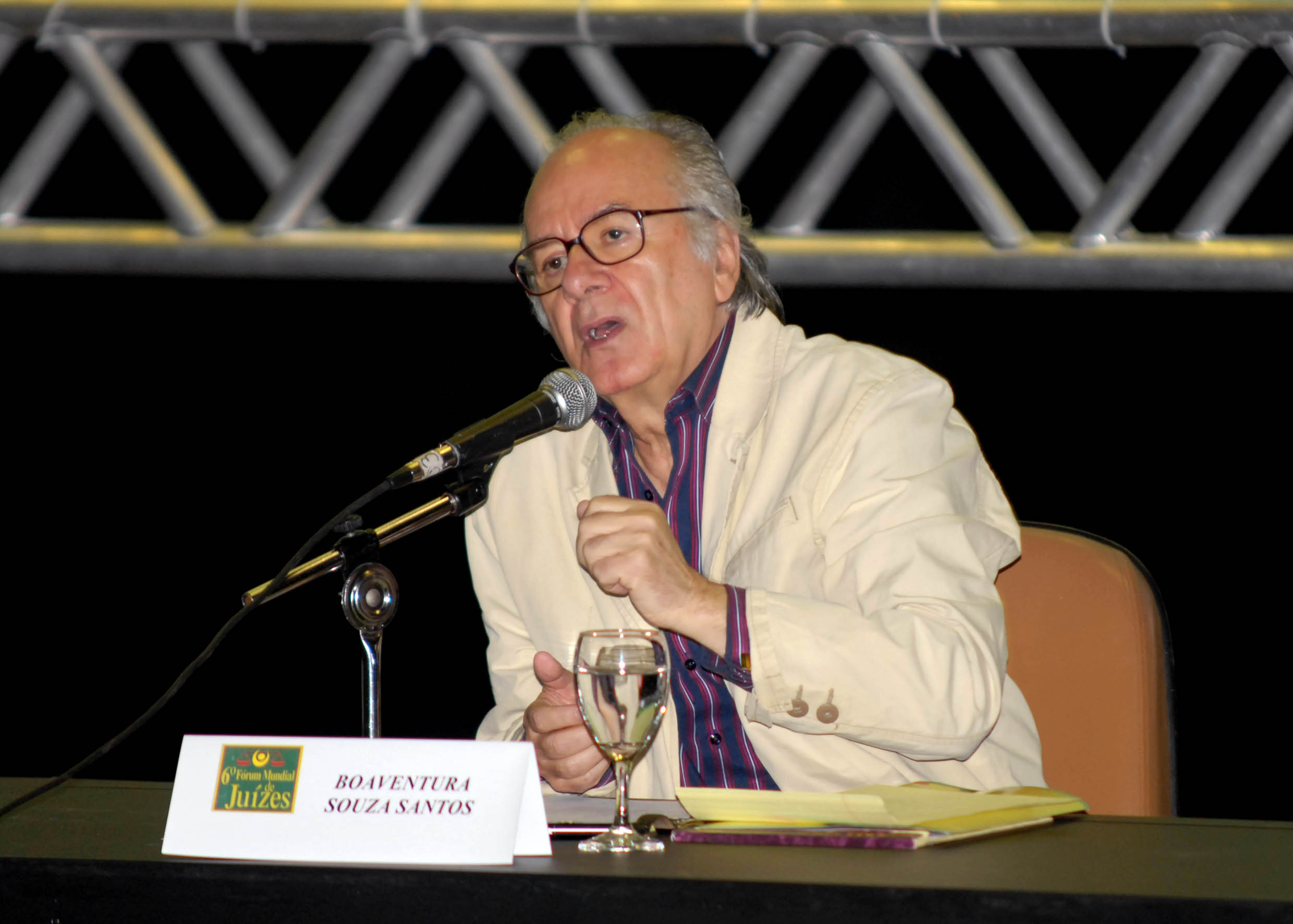
Portuguese sociologist Boaventura de Sousa Santos during the 6th World Forum of Judges, Brazil, 2010.

He has written extensively—across ten languages—on globalization, the sociology of law and the state, epistemology, social movements, and the World Social Forum. His honors include the Frantz Fanon Lifetime Achievement Award (Caribbean Philosophical Association, 2022), the Science and Technology Prize of Mexico (2010), and the Law and Society Association’s Kalven Jr. Prize (2011).

His most recent project, ALICE: Leading Europe to a New Way of Sharing the World Experiences, is funded by an Advanced Grant of the European Research Council (ERC), a highly competitive international financial institute for scientific research in Europe. The project was initiated in July 2011 and enabled him to gather a team of young researchers from various different countries and academic backgrounds who are committed to collectively develop the lines of research that have emerged from the epistemological, theoretical-analytical and methodological premises of the work he has consolidated over many years. The main idea underlying ALICE is to create a decentered conception of the anti-imperial South, in which Africa and Asia also find their place in a broader and more liberating conversation of humankind. A premise of ALICE is to bring to light the notion that the “Eurocentric world has not much to teach the wider world anymore and is almost incapable of learning from the experience of such a wider world, given the colonialist arrogance that still survives.”

== Ideology ==
We have the right to be equal whenever difference diminishes us; we have the right to be different whenever equality decharacterizes us.

— Boaventura de Sousa Santos (2001), "Nuestra America" (2001)

Boaventura de Sousa Santos has been engaged in a process of re-discovering Marxism. While acknowledging the limits of Marxism, Santos has more recently described Marxism as an “ongoing discovery.” During his studies in West Berlin, he was immersed in a university community that aspired to democratic values, while living in the context of the Cold War. This also allowed him to experience the stark contrast between the communist influence in East Germany and the liberal democratic ideology in West Germany. In 1970, Sousa Santos traveled to Brazil in order to do field research for his doctoral dissertation. His work was focused on the social organization of the construction of parallel legality in illegal communities, the favelas or squatter settlements.

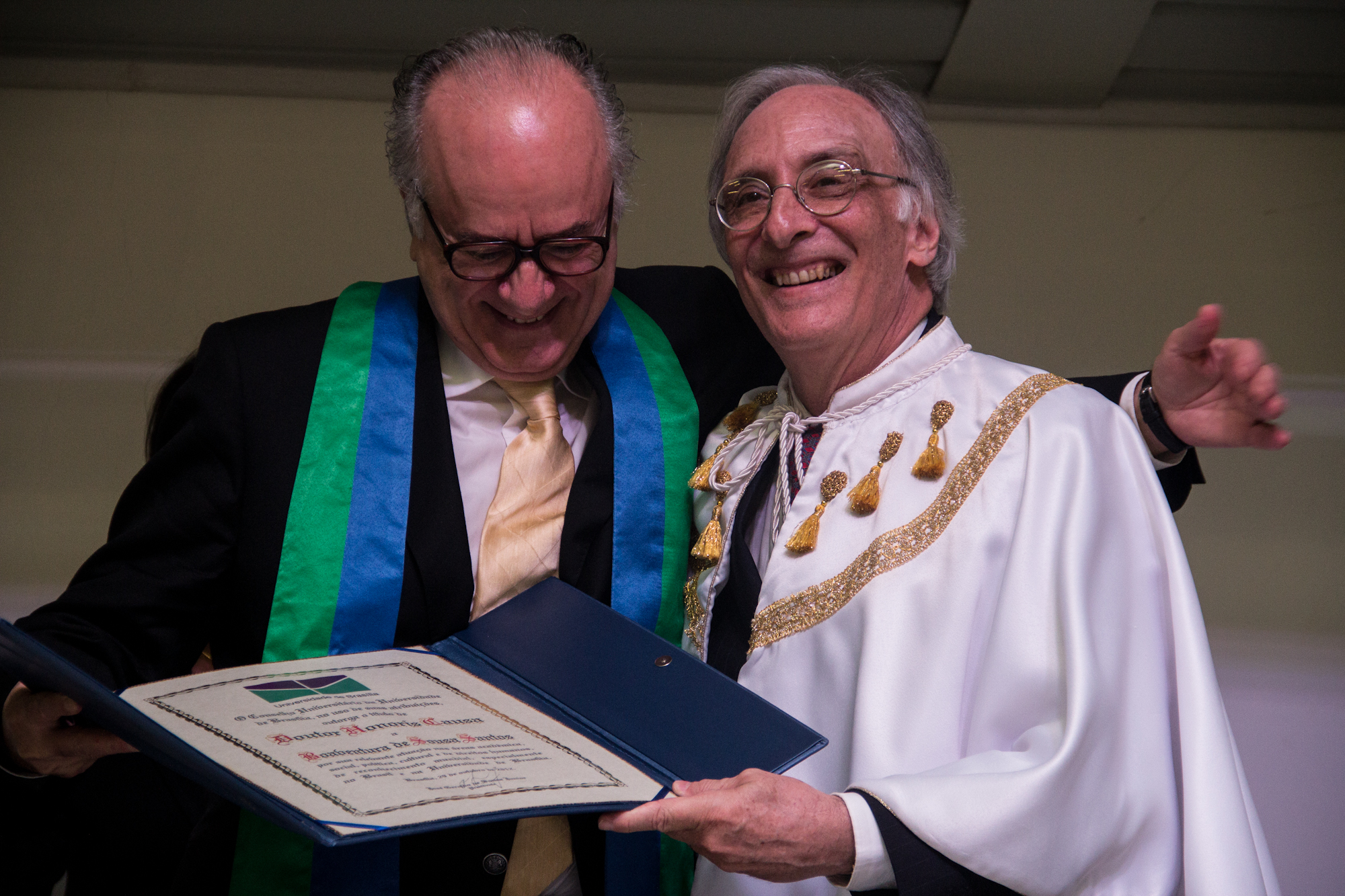
Sousa Santos (left) being awarded a doctorate honoris causa by the University of Brasília, in Brazil, 2012.

In the mid-1980s, he began to structurally adopt the role of a researcher whose understanding of the world extended beyond a Western perspective. His fieldwork was based on participant observation, lasting several months, in a Rio de Janeiro slum where he experienced the struggle of the excluded populations against oppression first hand. There, he learned from the wisdom of men and women struggling for subsistence and for recognition of their dignity. Sousa Santos believes in the importance of the social scientist striving for objectivity, not neutrality.

=== Sociology of absences ===
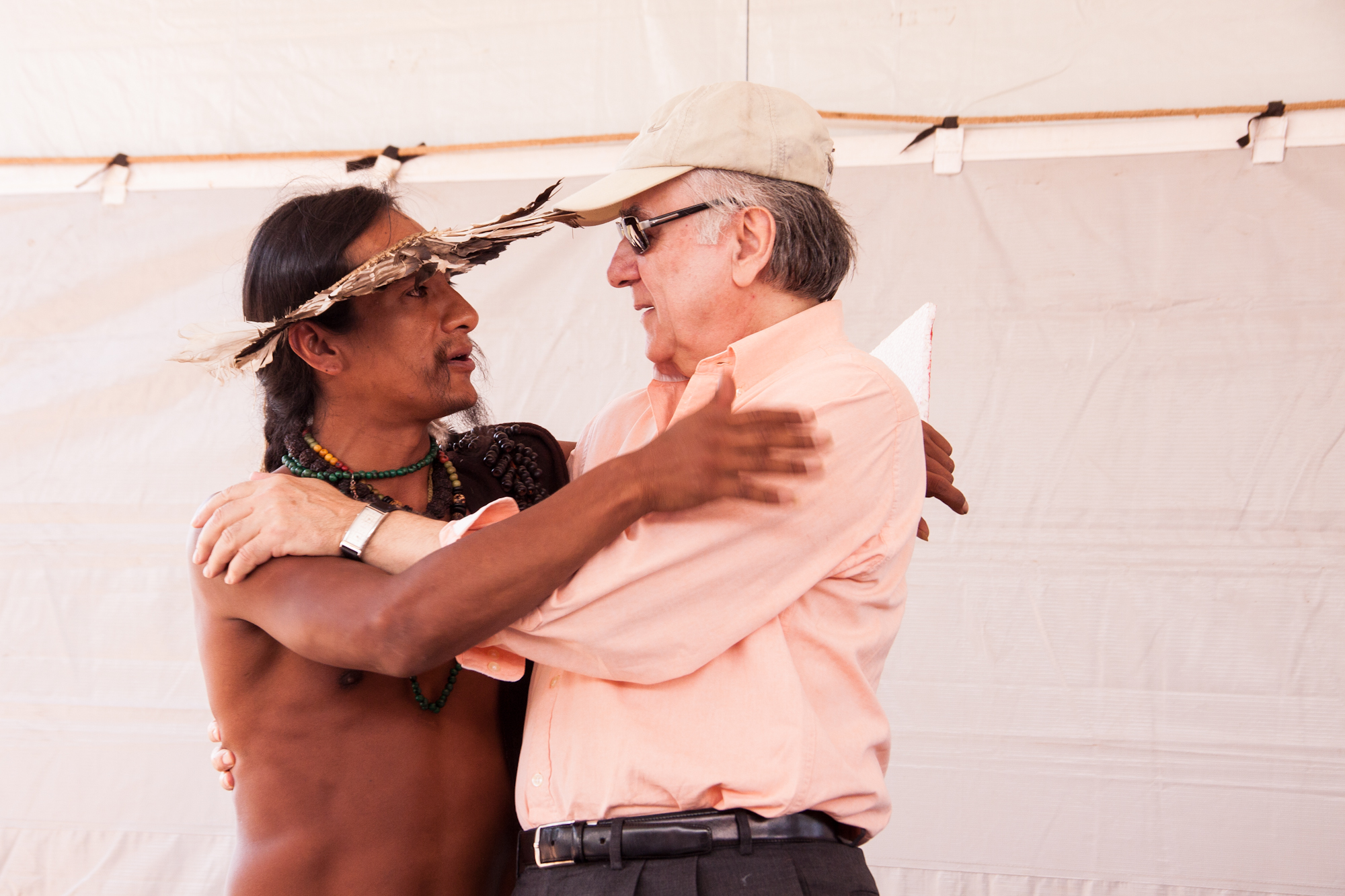
Inquietude class of Boaventura de Sousa Santos, Brasília, Brazil, 2012.

The sociology of absences is a sociological theory developed by Boaventura de Sousa Santos which, he says, "aims to show that what does not exist is in fact actively produced as non-existent, that is to say as an unbelievable alternative to what is supposed to exist”.

Southern epistemologies – Citizen movements and controversy over science is the title of the work in which Boaventura proposes this notion, which is articulated around the following thesis: “global justice is not possible without global cognitive justice".

== Sexual and moral harassment allegations ==
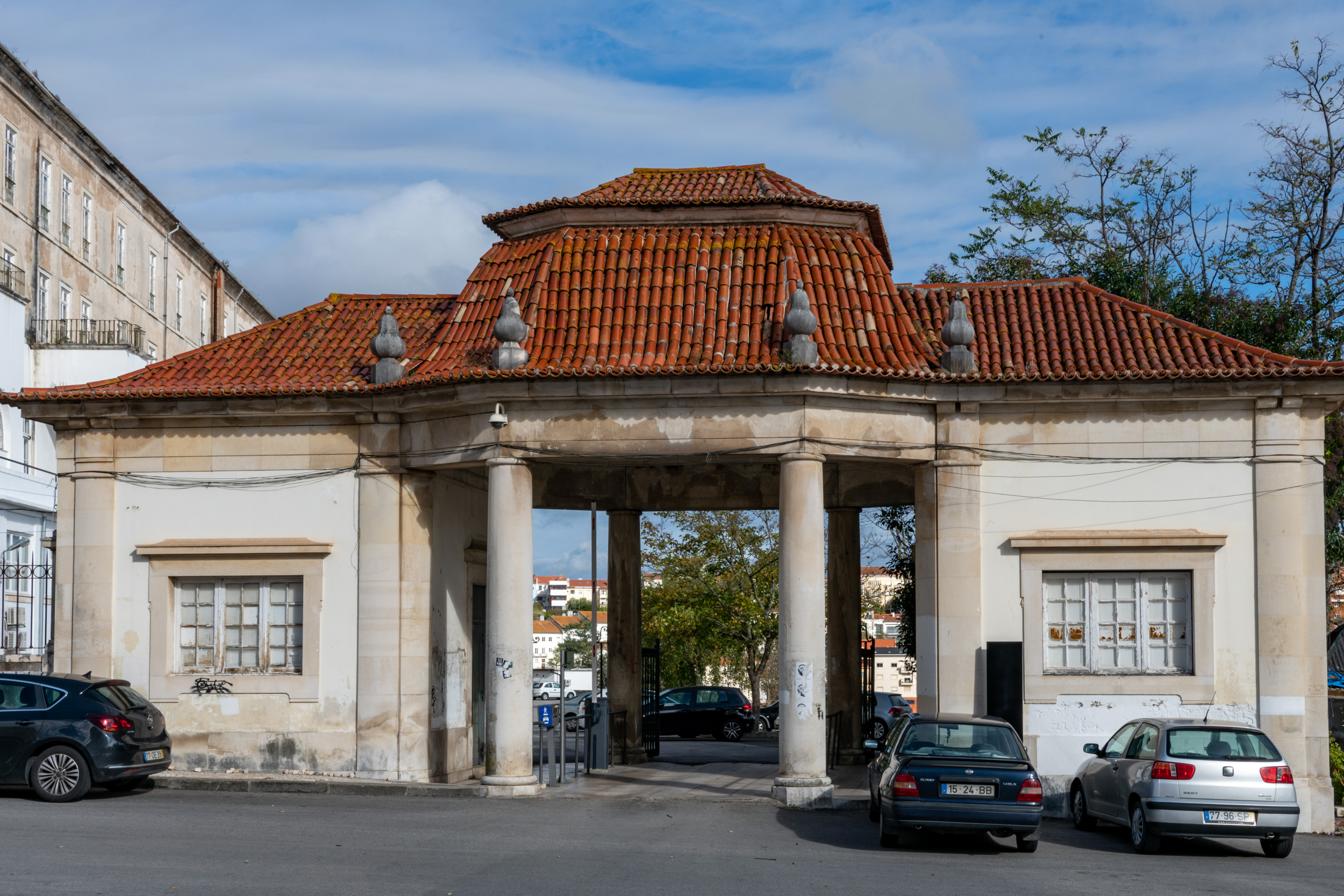
Entrance to the parking lot near the premises of the Centre for Social Studies (white facade on the left) at the Pólo I campus of the University of Coimbra.

=== Initial allegations ===
In April 2023, he was accused of a series of cases of sexual, moral and labour harassment in a publication by three former researchers from CES. The researchers, Lieselotte Viaene, who is Belgian; Catarina Laranjeiro, who is Portuguese; and Miye Nadya Tom, who is an enrolled member of the Native American Walker River Paiute Tribe and third-generation Russian-American, did not name the "Star Professor" at the center of their publication, but it was through this publication—a chapter in an edited volume titled “Sexual Misconduct in Academia: Informing an Ethics of Care in the University”—that the allegations began to be publicly associated with Boaventura de Sousa Santos. In their chapter, “The walls spoke when no one else would",” the three researchers point out three central figures: the “Star Professor”, the “Apprentice” and the “Watchwoman”. According to the female researchers’ curricula, all three worked for several years as researchers at CES in Coimbra. In the article, Boaventura de Sousa Santos is given the code name “Star Professor” and the professor and co-coordinator of a doctoral program, Bruno Sena Martins, is called the “Apprentice”. Maria Paula Meneses, also a senior researcher and professor at CES, is referred to as the Watchwoman. Anonymous graffiti that appeared on the walls of CES in 2018 inspired the title of the three former researchers’ chapter. The complainants describe a modus operandi in which the Star Professor would touch a knee of a female researcher under his supervision, asking her to deepen their mutual relationship in exchange of academic support. It would also allude to group dinners in Coimbra restaurants, and parties in private houses where the stalkers would harass their subordinates.

Contacted by Diário de Notícias, Boaventura de Sousa Santos recognized himself in the description of the former students, but denied all the accusations of misconduct and claimed he is being a cancel culture victim. According to the academic, he never has met two of the co-authors, Catarina Laranjeiro and Miye Nadya Tom. Sousa Santos said he recognized the main author, Lieselotte Viaene (Belgian anthropologist with a PhD in law from Ghent University in 2011, Professor at the Department of Social Sciences of the University Carlos III de Madrid, and holder of a prestigious ERC Grant). He states he met her twice, first as her Marie Curie Fellowship supervisor, and another "to solve the problems of incorrect and undisciplined behavior". He claims CES opened a disciplinary process and denied being host institution of her ERC Grant application. Sousa Santos states this case as the main motivation behind the accusations, classifying them as a "despicable act of institutional and personal revenge".

=== Further accusations ===
After those declarations became public, the Brazilian congresswoman, and member of the Municipal Chamber of Belo Horizonte, Bella Gonçalves, a politician of Brazil's Socialism and Liberty Party (PSOL), former student at the research centre CES in Coimbra, announced she had been sexually assaulted by Boaventura de Sousa Santos in the exact same way described in the article. She told the newspaper that, at the time, she reported the case to the CES management, who would have suggested she changed her advisor, arguing the professor was untouchable. She says that because of what happened, she decided to return to Brazil and finish her doctorate degree at a local university. After returning to Brazil, the former student says, she received an email from Boaventura de Sousa Santos. In it, the professor is said to have apologised for his behaviour, excusing himself by saying that he had fallen in love with her.

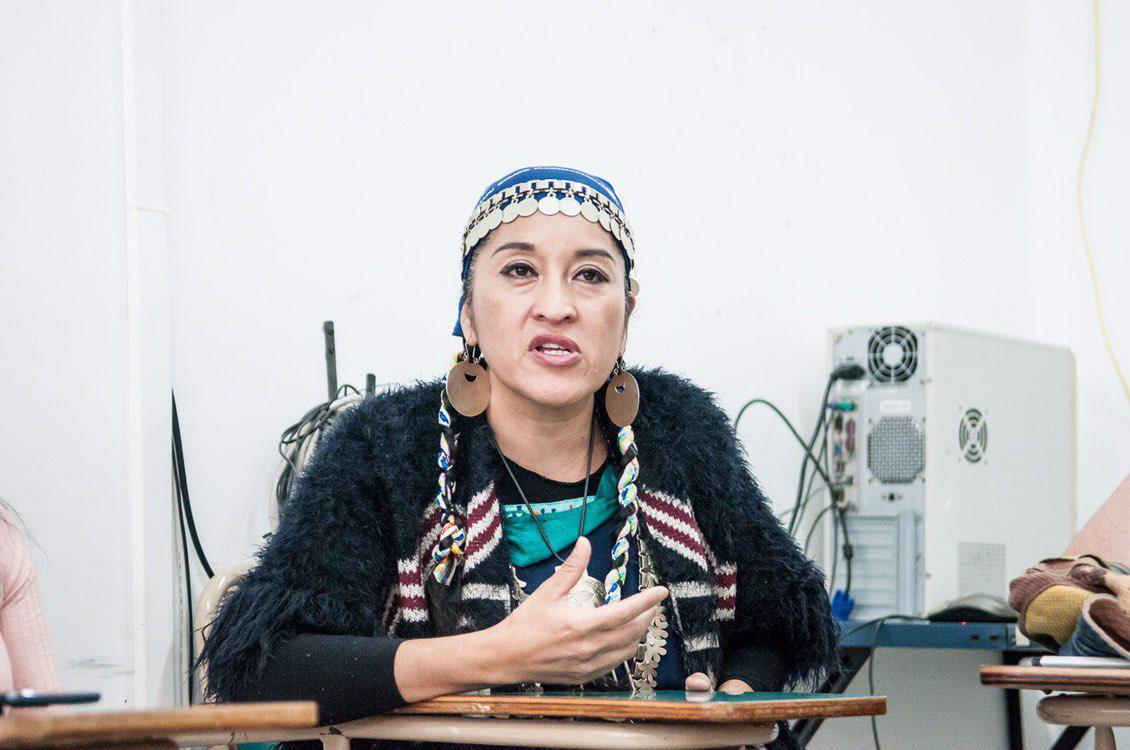
Moira Millán at the 3rd Encuentro Latinoamericano de Feminismos ELLA, a Latin American feminist meeting that took place in La Plata, Argentina, in December 2018.

The Argentinean indigenous left-wing activist Moira Ivana Millán had already told an Argentinean radio program about an episode of harassment to which she was subjected in Coimbra, Portugal, in 2010, by sociologist Boaventura de Sousa Santos, accusing him of moral and sexual harassment.

Boaventura de Sousa Santos rejected Millán’s accusations, publishing an email exchange with Moira Millán—both before and after her visit to CES—that demonstrated she was not telling the truth. He called on Millán to issue a public apology, but she stood by her claims and threatened to take legal action against him.

=== Reactions ===
Right after the publication of the article as well as the statements of Bella Gonzalvez and Moira Millan, Boaventura de Sousa Santos decided to suspend all his activities at CES and made himself available to any investigation, urging for an independent commission to be created to clarify the facts. In June 2023, Sousa Santos wrote an opinion piece in which he shows some self-criticism regarding the events described in the accusations, arguing he belongs to a generation with a sexist culture, although he continues to reject the allegations, highlighting his fight for equality. Some academics have publicly supported de Sousa Santos, criticizing the initial article methodologically, or as a form of lawfare. Some journalists have also expressed their support.

Although the Ombusdman of the institution argues she had not received any complaints of harassment within the institution in the two years she has been in those functions, in September 2023, CES created an independent commission to produce a formal report with conclusions.

The Latin American Council of Social Sciences suspended all activities with the researcher. The Spanish newspaper Publico, where Sousa Santos had a regular column, has suspended their ongoing collaboration.

In July 2023, the publisher Routledge withdrew the book "Sexual Misconduct in Academia" from publication. This book included the initial article. In September 2023, Taylor & Francis, owner of Routledge, made a statement arguing they had received "legal threats from various parties" and thus decided for the withdrawal. As a reaction, beyond the social media uproar, an open letter to Routledge received the support of 1,200 academics, asking the publisher to "state why they have removed" the book, and to "reinstate [it]" and "stand up to legal threats". In September 2023, the chapter was deleted by Routledge, which had all unsold books withdrawn.

=== Report by the Independent Commission ===
On 13 March 2024, the 114-page report by the Independent Commission of the Centre for Social Studies at the University of Coimbra confirmed the existence of evidence of abuse of power and sexual harassment at CES. However, it did not make formal accusations about Boaventura de Sousa Santos, who expressed both relief and concern about the report.

In addition to this report, the CES apologised "to people who consider themselves victims of harassing or abusive behaviour" and promised to take action and provide reparations. The CES claimed it would hand the evidence to the public prosecutor office to consider further legal actions.

In the report, the Independent Commission states it gathered testimonies of 32 people presenting allegations, 78% women, where around half were victims and the rest witnesses. Most part were students and recent PhDs, and they spoke of moral harassment (28%), sexual harassment and sexual abuse (27%) and abuse of power (27%). The report speaks of perpetrators systematic blurring of professional and private life, situations of non-consensual touching, encouraging alcohol drinking, and offers of academic benefits in exchange of sexual favours. The report covers 14 people accused, in three groups of responsibilities: of committing the acts, cover-ups and negligence.

Activist Moira Millán criticized the report, arguing the commission did not name the abusers, did not apologize to victims outside academia. She announced she will initiate legal actions against the university, on top of her legal action against Santos.

A year after the first accusations of sexual harassment, and as soon as the report by the independent commission was made public, Boaventura de Sousa Santos was removed from his position as a judge at the International Rights of Nature Tribunal.

=== Legal proceedings and rulings ===
In 2026, several decisions by the Portuguese Public Prosecutor's Office concerning legal proceedings arising from the allegations became public.

In January 2026, complaints for insult and defamation filed by de Sousa Santos against women who had accused him of sexual and moral harassment and intellectual extraction were dismissed. The Public Prosecutor's Office found insufficient evidence of false testimony, while the complaint concerning insult was also dismissed because it had been filed outside the statutory time limit.

In April 2026, it was reported that the investigation into alleged sexual offences connected to the Centre for Social Studies (CES) had been partially closed. The decision was based on the absence of individual complaints filed within the six-month statutory period. The closure concerned the investigation into possible sexual offences and did not amount to a judicial determination on the truth or falsity of the allegations.

In June 2026, a separate defamation complaint filed against de Sousa Santos by three women was dismissed after they withdrew it. The Public Prosecutor's Office approved the withdrawal and ordered the case to be closed. According to reports by the Portuguese news agency Lusa, de Sousa Santos had not been formally constituted as a defendant in those proceedings. The women's lawyer stated that other proceedings concerning the CES independent commission's report remained under investigation and subject to judicial secrecy.

== Personal life ==
Boaventura de Sousa Santos is married to Maria Irene Ramalho, professor emerita of American Studies and Feminist Studies at the Faculty of Arts of the University of Coimbra (FLUC), as well as a former Assistant Professor International in the Department of Comparative Literature at the University of Wisconsin-Madison. She was also a researcher at the Centre for Social Studies, as well as member of the ethics committee to evaluate the propriety of research projects conducted at CES between February 2022 and April 2023. The couple has children. He owns the farmhouse in Penacova that belonged to his paternal grandparents before belonging to his father, and uses it as a second home after his main residence in Coimbra. He has the eye condition called amblyopia.

== Distinctions ==
- 1994 - Pen Club Português 1994 Prize.
- 1996 - Grand Officer of the Order of Saint James of the Sword
- 1996 - Grand Officer of the Order of Rio Branco, Brazil.
- 1996 - Gulbenkian Science Prize.
- 2001 - Jabuti Award - Area of Human Sciences and Education, Brazil.
- 2005 - "Recognition of Merit" Award, granted by Universidad Veracruzana, Mexico.
- 2006 - Ezequiel Martínez Estrada Essay Award 2006, from Casa de las Américas, Cuba.
- 2007 - Honorable mention of the "Premio Libertador al Pensamiento Crítico - *2006", Venezuela.
- 2009 - Adam Podgórecki Award, International Sociological Association.
- 2010 - National Award for Science and Technology, Mexico.
- 2012 - Doctor Honoris Causa from the University of Brasilia, Brazil.
- 2013 - National Poetry Award Vila de Fânzeres, for the work "Pomada em Pó", Portugal.
- 2014 - Doctor Honoris Causa by Universidade Federal de Sergipe, Brazil.
- 2014 - Doctor Honoris Causa by Universidade Federal de Mato Grosso, Brazil.
- 2016 - Title of Citizen of Porto Alegre, granted by the City Council of Porto Alegre, Brazil.
- 2016 - Doctor Honoris Causa from the University of Cordoba, Argentina.
- 2016 - Doctor Honoris Causa from the University of La Plata, Buenos Aires, Argentina.
- 2017 - Doctor Honoris Causa from the Universidad Iberoamericana, Mexico City, Mexico.
- 2018 - Doctor Honoris Causa from the University of Coruña, Spain.
- 2019 - Doctor Honoris Causa from the University of Costa Rica, Costa Rica.

== Selected works ==
Sousa Santos has published extensively on globalization, the sociology of law and the state, epistemology, democracy, and human rights. His work has appeared in Portuguese, Spanish, English, Italian, French, German, and Mandarin.

Among his most recent and relevant publications are:

- 1991: State, Law and Social Struggles.
- 1998: Reinventing Democracy, Reinventing the State. 1998. Lisbon.
- 1998: La globalización del derecho: los nuevos caminos de la regulación y la emancipación (The globalization of law: the new paths of regulation and emancipation). Bogotá: ILSA, Ediciones Universidad Nacional de Colombia.
- 1998: De la mano de Alicia. Lo Social y lo político en la postmodernidad. Bogotá: Siglo del Hombre Editores and Universidad de los Andes.
- 2000: Critique of the Indolent Reason. Against the waste of experience. Bilbao: Editora Desclée de Brouwer.
- 2004: Democracy and Participation: El ejemplo del presupuesto participativo de Porto Alegre. Mexico: Quito: Abya-yala. ISBN 968-16-7255-0
- 2004: Democratizar la democracia: Los caminos de la democracia participativa. Mexico: F.C.E. ISBN 968-16-7255-0
- 2004: Escrita INKZ. Anti-manifesto para uma arte incapaz. Rio de Janeiro: Aeroplano.
- 2005: World Social Forum. Manual de Uso. Barcelona: Icaria.
- 2005: El milenio huérfano: ensayo para una nueva cultura política. Madrid: Trotta. ISBN 978-84-8164-750-1
- 2005: La universidad en el siglo xxi. Para una reforma democrática y emancipadora de la universidad (with Naomar de Almeida Filho). Miño y Dávila Editores.
- 2006: The Heterogeneous State and Legal Pluralism in Mozambique, Law & Society Review, 40, 1: 39–75.
- 2007: The Reinvention of the State and the Plurinational State. Cochabamba: International Alliance CENDA-CEJIS-CEDIB, Bolivia.
- 2007: Law and globalization from below. Towards a cosmopolitan legality. With Rodríguez Garavito, César A. (Eds.), Barcelona: Univ. Autónoma Metropolitan de México / Anthropos. ISBN 978-84-7658-834-5
- 2008: Conocer desde el Sur: Para una cultura política emancipatoria. La Paz: Plural Editores.
- 2008: Reiventar la democracia, reinventar el estado (Reviving democracy, reinventing the state). Spain: Sequitur.
- 2009: Critical Legal Sociology: For a New Common Sense of Law. Madrid: Trotta. ISBN 978-84-8164-983-3
- 2009: Thinking the State and Society: Current Challenges. Argentina: Hydra Books. ISBN 978-987-25178-1-6
- 2009: An epistemology of the SOUTH. With María Paula (Eds.) Mexico: Siglo XXI Editores.
- 2010: Refounding the State in Latin America: Perspectives from an Epistemology of the South. Mexico: Siglo XXI Editores. ISBN 978-607-03-0242-8
- 2010: Decolonizing knowledge, reinventing power. Uruguay: Trilce Editorial. ISBN 978-9974-32-546-3
- 2011: To decolonize the West. Beyond abysmal thinking. San Cristóbal de las Casas, Chiapas: Editorial Cideci Unitierra.
- 2011: Law and emancipation. Quito: Constitutional Court for the Transition Period.
- 2012: From dualities to ecologies. La Paz: REMTE-Bolivian Network of Women Transforming the Economy.
- 2014: Human rights, democracy and development. Bogotá: Center for the Study of Law, Justice and Society, Dejusticia.
- 2014: Democracy on the brink of chaos. Essay against self-flagellation. Bogotá: Siglo Del Hombre Editores/Siglo XXI Editores.
- 2014: If God were a human rights activist. Madrid: Editorial Trotta.
- 2014: Epistemologies of the South (perspectives). Co-authored by Maria Paula Meneses. Editorial Akal ISBN 978-84-460-3955-6.
- 2015: Revueltas de indignación y otras conversas. La Paz: OXFAM; CIDES-UMSA; Ministry of Autonomies.
- 2016: The difficult democracy. Una mirada desde la periferia Europea Editorial Akal.
- 2017: Las bifurcaciones del orden. Revolution, city, countryside and indignation. Madrid: Trotta. ISBN 978-84-9879-728-2.
- 2017: Demodiversity. Imagining New Democratic Possibilities. Co-authored by José Manuel Mendes. Madrid: Akal. ISBN 978-607-97537-5-7
- 2017: Justicia entre Saberes: Epistemologías del sur contra el Epistemicidio. Madrid: Morata.
- 2018: Leftists of the world, unite! Barcelona: Icaria. ISBN 978-84-9888-875-1.
- 2018: Constructing the Epistemologies of the South. Antología Esencial (two volumes). Buenos Aires: CLACSO. ISBN 978-987-722-364-4
- 2019: The End of the Cognitive Empire. La afirmación de las epistemologías del Sur. Madrid: Trotta. ISBN 978-84-9879-780-0
- 2019: The pluriverse of human rights. The diversity of struggles for dignity. Co-authored by Bruno Sena. Madrid: Akal. ISBN 978-607-98185-6-2
- 2019: Global learnings. Decolonizing, demercantilizing and depatriarchalizing from epistemologies of the South. Co-authored by Antoni Aguiló. Barcelona: Icaria. ISBN 978-84-9888-874-4.
- 2020: Knowledge born in struggles. Constructing epistemologies of the South. Co-authored by Maria Paula Meneses. Madrid: Akal. ISBN 978-607-8683-38-3.
- 2020: In the workshop of the artisan sociologist. Madrid: Morata. ISBN 978-84-7112-987-1
- 2020: The cruel pedagogy of the virus. Translation by Paula Vasile. Buenos Aires: CLACSO. ISBN 978-987-722-599-0
- 2021: The future begins now. From pandemic to utopia. Madrid: Akal. ISBN 978-84-460-4976-0
- 2021: Decolonizing Constitutionalism. Beyond false or impossible promises. Co-authored by Sara Araújo and Orlando Aragón Andrade. Madrid: Akal. ISBN 978-607-8683-59-8
- 2022: Economies of Good Living. Against the waste of experiences. Co-authored by Teresa Cunha. Madrid: Akal. ISBN 978-607-8683-97-0
