= Sociology of absences =

Decolonial theory

The sociology of absences is a sociological theory developed by Boaventura de Sousa Santos which, he says, "aims to show that what does not exist is in fact actively produced as non-existent, that is to say as an unbelievable alternative to what is supposed to exist”.

Southern epistemologies – Citizen movements and controversy over science is the title of the work in which Boaventura proposes this notion, which is articulated around the following thesis: “global justice is not possible without global cognitive justice".

== For a decolonial sociology ==
The sociology of absences seeks to produce an epistemology of the south and aspires to be a critical, decolonial sociology that rejects eurocentric universalism. It is therefore a critique of the perceived hegemony of Eurocentric epistemology; an alternative to single thought and the standardization of the world.

=== Critique of Western modernity ===
In Boaventura's thought, there exists in modernity an abyssal line between two kinds of beings on the planet: those who live above this line and those who live below. The first are in what Frantz Fanon calls the zone of being. The second are in the zone of non-being and undergo a racial inferiority which manifests itself both at the level of the processes of economic and political domination and exploitation, and at the level of epistemological processes. Hence, the notion of epistemic racism which results in “a hierarchy of colonial domination where the knowledge produced by Western subjects in the zone of being are considered a priori superior to the knowledge produced by non-Western subjects. The knowledge produced by subjects belonging to the zone of being is assumed to be automatically and universally valid for all contexts and all situations in the world. This situation constitutes a Eurocentric bias that Boaventura calls: indolent reason. It is, he says, a rationality that considers itself unique and exclusive, which does not make sufficient efforts to look at the inexhaustible wealth of the world. It manifests itself in two forms: metonymic reason and proleptic reason. “As a metonymical reason, it diminishes the present; as a proleptic reason, it expands the future to infinity. Boaventura proposes a different model in place of these: cosmopolitan rationality, one of the major processes of which is the sociology of absences.

In this regard, Edgar Morin writes: “Rationality is not a quality that Western civilization would have as a monopoly. The European West has long believed itself to be the owner of rationality, seeing only errors, illusions and backwardness in other cultures [...]”.

=== Aim of the sociology of absences ===
The goal of this sociology is to make impossible objects possible, to make absent objects present. To put it another way, it makes it possible to map the abyss mentioned above and it describes the mechanisms of rejection of certain forms of sociability into non-existence, into radical invisibility, into the negligible and the insignificant. It analyzes the processes by which colonialism, capitalism and patriarchy continue to produce abysmal exclusions. It highlights the way in which positivist scientific hegemony rejects a category of knowledge. This discarded or rejected knowledge constitutes a form of cognitive injustice that has been referred to as epistemicides.

=== Production logics of absences ===
Boaventura presents five logical formulations which constitute modes of production of absences, of non-existences.

The first is to ignore. It stems from the “monoculture of knowledge and rigour”. It reflects the idea that the only rigorous knowledge is scientific knowledge and considers the subject who does not correspond to it as ignorant. It excludes all other forms of knowledge that do not correspond to the epistemic charter as conceived by positivist science. The second is based on the “monoculture of linear time” which is a logic according to which history has only one meaning and only one direction. Also, it holds as backward everything that is asymmetrical in relation to what is considered advanced by Western modernity. The third is that of the “monoculture of the naturalization of differences”. It consists of classifying populations by racial or gender categories in order to naturalize the hierarchies from which relations of domination result. The fourth refers to a logic of the “dominant scale”. In Western modernity, the dominant scale is formalized through universalism and globalization. They produce a non-existence that takes the form of the particular or the local. The last is based on the “monoculture of the criteria of capitalist productivity”. It makes economic growth an indisputable rational objective. Thus, the unproductive becomes a non-existence.

== Epistemological alternatives ==
Boaventura seeks to develop a new epistemology capable of favoring the egalitarian theoretical dialogue between the knowledge of the North and the knowledge of the South. Consequently, the notion of sociology of emergences arises.

=== Sociology of emergences ===
The sociology of emergences explores the possible alternatives to the logics of production of absences. It proposes, as a solution to monocultures, ecologies that would make present what is perceived as absent. For example, faced with the monoculture of knowledge and rigour, it proposes the ecology of knowledge, where an infinity of diversified knowledge co-exists, without hierarchy or privileges, without being separated. This form of ecology is an approach that allows us to think about epistemological, political and economic pluralism. It correlates to the epistemology of the link, which is a way of creating sociological knowledge devoid of indifference, marks of epistemological privileges and the logic of erasure.

=== Epistemology of the South ===
The sociology of absences and the sociology of emergences are two complementary concepts that make it possible to constitute an alternative that Boaventura calls “the epistemology of the South”. It is “a new production and evaluation of knowledge or valid knowledge, scientific or not”. In other words, it is “new relations between different types of knowledge, based on the practices of classes and social groups that have systematically suffered from the inequalities and discriminations of capitalism and colonialism”. This epistemology is based on two postulates. According to the first, the understanding of the world goes far beyond Western knowledge of the world. As for the second, it implies that the diversity of the world is infinite. It seeks recognition for non-scientific knowledge along with scientific knowledge that is developed through "non-extractive methodologies with a view to contributing to the ecology of knowledge". It promotes the idea of "knowing with the other, and not about the other", pleading for an inverted process of knowledge diffusion where "instead of transferring it from the university to society, it is now a question of bringing non-scientific knowledge from outside the university inside of its walls to foster dialogues and intercultural translation, and thus strengthen social struggles against domination".

It should be clarified that this epistemology is not a claim in favor of a geographical region. The concept "South", here, is not synonymous with a geographical entity. Rather, it is understood as a metaphor for indicating the human suffering caused by the dominant world order.

Moreover, this epistemology corresponds to the epistemological, ethical and political ideal of the notion of cognitive justice as interpreted by the open science movement.

== See also ==
- Decolonization of knowledge
- Cognitive justice
