= Isabel Jonet =

President of Portuguese Association of Food Banks

- Born: 16 February 1960; Cascais, Portugal
- Occupation: Philanthropist,
- Known for: Role in supporting Portuguese food banks
- Children: 5
- Awards: Grand Officer of the Order of Merit

Isabel Jonet (born 1960) is the current president of the Federação Portuguesa dos Bancos Alimentares Contra a Fome (Portuguese Federation of Food Banks Against Hunger) and the founder and a director of ENTRAJUDA, a charity that supports other charities in areas such as management and organization. She was chair of the board of directors of the European Federation of Food Banks between 2012 and 2017.

== Early life ==
Maria Isabel Torres Baptista Parreira Jonet was born in Cascais, Portugal on 16 February 1960, one of five children. Her parents were both agronomists. She went to school in Oeiras, to the west of Lisbon. From the age of 12 she was working as a volunteer in her summer holidays, entertaining young children in hospital who were awaiting operations.

Jonet has a degree in Economics from the Faculty of Human Sciences of the Catholic University of Portugal. After graduating, she took a job in the insurance industry. She married and moved to Brussels for eight years, where her husband had been posted as a journalist, and where she also worked, initially in the insurance industry and then as a translator for the European Commission. The couple have five children.

== Charitable activities ==
Returning to Portugal in 1994, Jonet worked part time but also started to volunteer at the Lisbon food bank for two afternoons a week. Within a month she was on the Bank's management board. She continues to do shifts, as one of around 40,000 such volunteers in Portugal, but is now a full-time volunteer for the Portuguese food-bank movement. She is president of the Portuguese Federation of Food Banks Against Hunger and of the Food Bank Against Hunger in Lisbon. The former raises food for around 2,600 outlets that provide food to over 400,000 people.

In November 2012, a public petition was raised to try to persuade the Association to remove Jonet from her position, due to controversial statements she made at a time of austerity, such as "we will have to relearn to live poorer" and "if we don’t have money to eat steaks every day, we can't eat steaks every day". However, in response to this petition, others, with many more signatures, emerged in her defence. Jonet was chair of the Board of Directors of the European Federation of Food Banks between 2012 and 2017.

In 2004, Jonet founded ENTRAJUDA, an innovative project, inspired by the food banks, that aims to provide charitable organizations with management and organizational tools and resources that can be shared to increase their efficiency. To do this she has launched various projects, including those facilitating exchange of volunteers, a bank of donated goods, and an equipment bank.

== Honours and awards ==
- 2005. Human Rights Award, awarded by the Assembly of the Republic of Portugal to the Food Bank Against Hunger.
- 2006. Career Award, from the Catholic University of Portugal.
- 2007. Dona Antónia Ferreira Award
- 2011. Prémio Femina for acts of Humanitarianism in favour of the dignity and rights of the human being.
- 2017. Grand Officer of the Order of Merit, a Portuguese national award.
- 2019. António Quadros Foundation Award.
- 2019. Personality of the Year. O Mirante newspaper.
