= Moira Millán =

Mapuche and feminist leader in Argentina

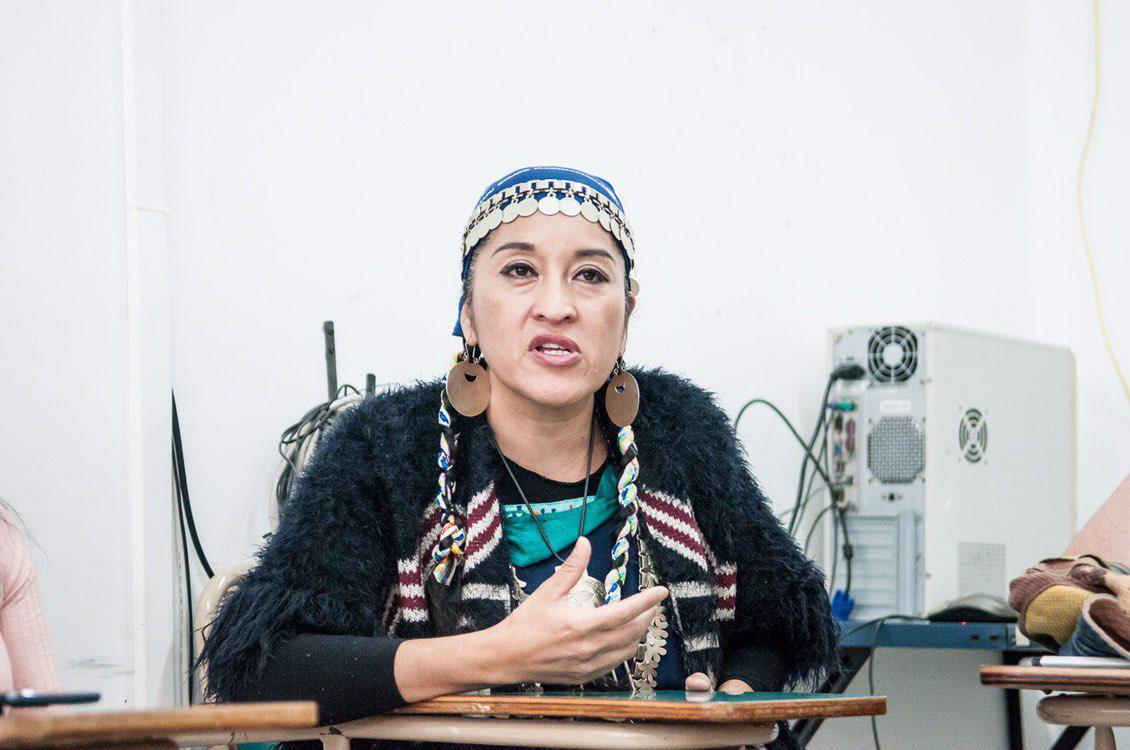
- In December 2018
- Born: Moira Ivana Millán; August 1970 (age 55); El Maitén, Chubut Province, Argentina
- Occupation: Activist
- Parent: Luis Millán

Moira Ivana Millán (born August 1970), is a Mapuche activist from Argentina. She is one of the leaders of the indigenous ancestral lands recovery movement (particularly those occupied by the Benetton Group). The recovery rights are recognized by the 1994 amendment of the Constitution of Argentina. She participates in the feminist movement Ni una menos, denouncing the feminicide of indigenous women, and promotes in the "Women's Encounters" the greater visibility of the problem of indigenous women.

== Biography ==
She was born in El Maitén, province of Chubut, in August 1970. She grew up in a family of five brothers, belonging to the Mapuche and Tehuelche nations. In 1971 her father, Luis Millán, railway worker and victim of the acculturation of the Mapuche people, moved with the whole family to Bahía Blanca for work reasons. The Millán family settled in a villa miseria inhabited mainly by indigenous people, mostly Mapuches. Moira suffered racism in Bahía Blanca, both from a society that rejected "the Indians", and from a school that glorified the military as heroes who had defeated the Mapuche nation in the so-called Conquest of the Desert and enslaved the survivors.

She began working at age twelve as a maid, suffering sexual harassment from her employers. Shortly after she began to actively spread the evangelical creed, moving to Brazil, where she participated in the Basic ecclesial community and identified with the Workers' Party (PT), led by Luiz Inácio Lula da Silva. At age 18, in 1988, she decided to recover her indigenous roots, returning to the ancestral lands of her father, in the area of Ingeniero Jacobacci, province of Rio Negro.

In 1992 she joined the Mapuche-Tehuelche Organization October, which in 1996 denounced the disappearance of the rural worker from Benetton's residence, Eduardo Cañulef, a situation that has multiplied since then. In 1999 Moira and her family settled in an ancestral Mapuche territory of 150 hectares, on the banks of the Palena River, founding the Pïllan Mahuiza community in Chubut. After years of confrontations and threats, the community managed to establish itself. The community opposes the project of building a large dam in that area, which would completely flood its lands.

She was a co-writer and protagonist of the documentary Pupila de mujer, mirada de la tierra, which was the winner by Argentina of the third edition of the DocTV Latin America contest. The documentary, premiered in 2012 on public television channels in several South American countries, addresses from a gender perspective the problem of identity and the struggle for the territory of native peoples.

In 2012, she began a series of meetings with women from different communities of native peoples of Argentina, actions that gave rise to the first March of Native Women for Good Living in 2015, representing 36 native nations. In 2018, This initiative was consolidated with the formation of the Movement of Indigenous Women for Good Living, which defines itself as anti-patriarchal, of which Moira Millán is coordinator and reference.

Millán actively participated in the events developed following the disappearance and death of Santiago Maldonado in 2017 and in the mobilizations. In 2018, within the framework of the 33rd National Meeting of Women, she coordinated a workshop on “Women and self-determination of the peoples”, in which the use of the term “Plurinational” was proposed as a way of explaining the presence and participation of indigenous women.

She began to report receiving death threats against her and her daughters in 2017, purportedly due to her involvement in the case of the disappearance and murder of Santiago Maldonado.

In 2018, she was charged with "aggravated coercion" by the Federal Prosecutor of Esquel, after participating in the protests. She was absolved by the Federal Court of Justice of Comodoro Rivadavia in 2019.

In 2019, Millan published a book, the novel El tren del olvido.

== Boaventura de Sousa Santos' sexual assault ==
Moira Ivana Millán told an Argentinean radio program about an episode of harassment to which she was subjected in Coimbra, Portugal, in 2010, by the prominent Portuguese sociologist and left-wing intellectual Boaventura de Sousa Santos, accusing him of conducts of moral and sexual harassment. In June 2022, during a meeting of indigenous women in Mexico, she also spoke about Boaventura de Sousa Santos' unconsummated attempt to have a nonconsensual sexual relation with her. Moira Ivana Millán said she was advised not to talk about it so as not to appear to be playing "the right's game".
