= Isabel Capeloa Gil =

Rector of the Catholic University of Portugal

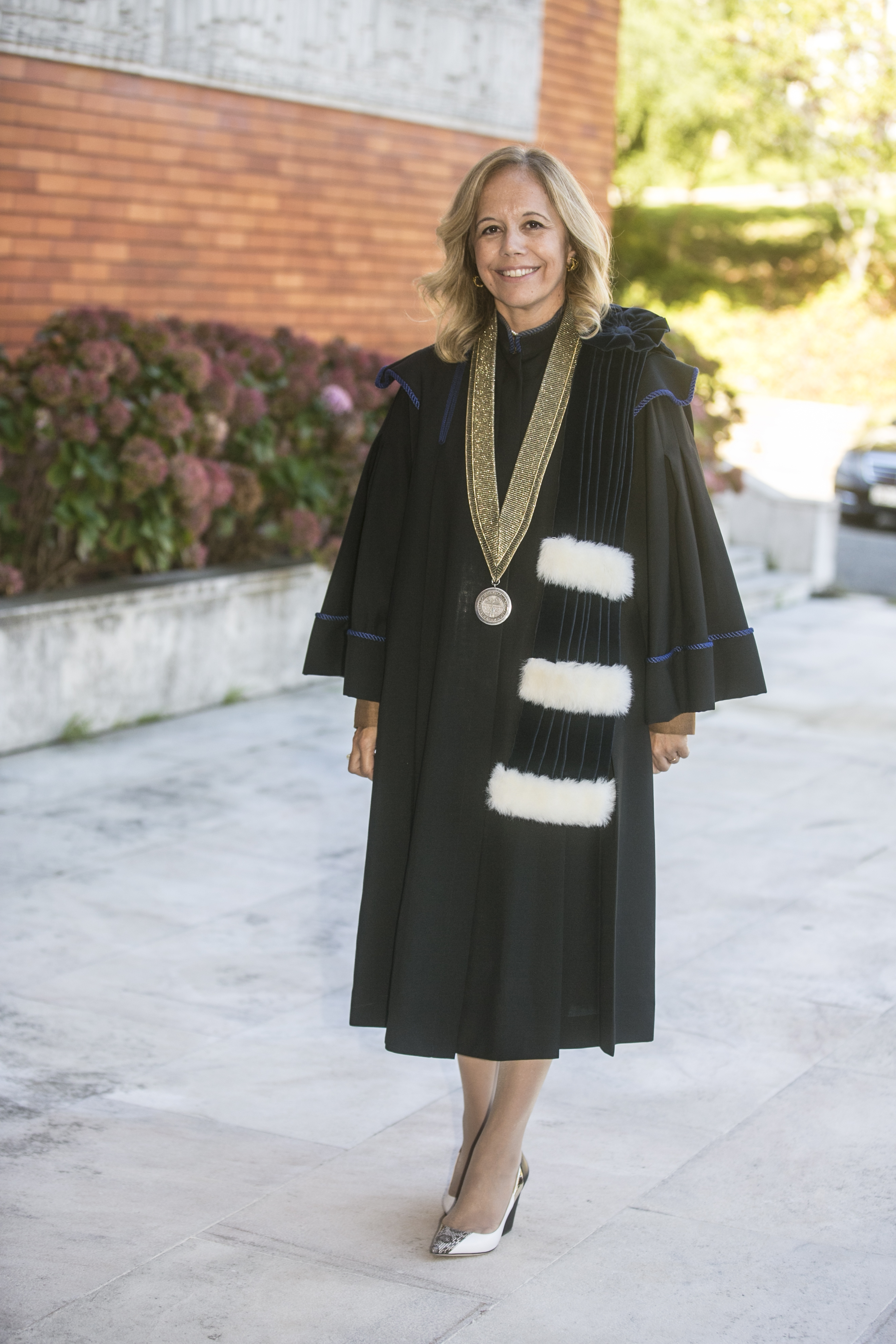
Isabel Capeloa Gil as the 6th Rector of the Catholic University of Portugal (UCP)

Isabel Maria de Oliveira Capeloa Gil (Mira, Mira, 22 July 1965) is a Portuguese academic. She is the 6th Presidente of the Universidade Católica Portuguesa, appointed by the Congregation for Catholic Education on 26 September 2016, at the proposal of the Grand Chancellor of the institution, D. Manuel Clemente, 17th Patriarch of Lisbon. She took office on 28 October 2016. On 23 October 2020, Isabel Capeloa Gil was reappointed President of the Universidade Católica Portuguesa for the 2020–2024 term. On 15 November 2024, she began a third term as president, for the four-year period 2024–2028, by decision of the Grand Chancellor of the Universidade Católica Portuguesa, D. Rui Valério.

== Biography ==
Having grown up in China (Macao), Isabel Gil has a special interest in researching issues of diversity and conflict and has structured her work around the exploration of the disciplinary boundaries between literature, the arts and other disciplines. She is an advocate of international education.

The main projects that marked her first mandate as President of Universidade Católica Portuguesa, between 2016 and 2020, were: the development of the project of national strategic interest between Universidade Católica Portuguesal, the American biotechnology company Amyris, Inc. and the Portuguese State, with a value of 42 million euros; the accreditation of the first Integrated master's degree in medicine, at a non-state University; and the development of the new infrastructures of the headquarters of Universidade Católica - Campus Veritati.

Isabel Capeloa Gil founded the Strategic Alliance of Catholic Research Universities (SACRU) in 2017, an alliance between the Universidade Católica portuguesa and seven Universidades Católicas (U. Ramon Llull, U. Sacro Cuore, Australian Catholic University, Boston College, PUC-Rio de Janeiro, PUC-Chile, Sophia University).

In 2018, she was elected the first woman President of the International Federation of Catholic Universities and was responsible for the strategic plan "A Global Voice for a Common Future" and founder of the task force for women's leadership of Catholic Universities.

Isabel Capeloa Gil is a Member of the Board of Trustees of the Global Federation of Competitiveness Councils (GFCC) (2021).

In July 2022, she joined the advisory board of the Portuguese Diaspora Council.

In August 2022, Isabel Capeloa Gil was re-elected President of the International Federation of Catholic Universities.

In September 2022, she joined the Board of Trustees of Europaeum.

On 28 July 2025, she was elected President of the Strategic Alliance of Catholic Research Universities (SACRU).

== Other activities ==
- European Council on Foreign Relations (ECFR), Member of the Council
- Gulbenkian Foundation, Member of the Advisory Board
- UCP Foundation, President of the Board (since 2016)

== Honors and awards ==
- (2025) Honoured by Pope Leo XIV with the title of Dame of the Order of Saint Sylvester Pope
- (2025) Honoured with the Most Influential Women of Portugal Award, 2024
- (2025) Appointed Member of the General Council of Saarland University (first non-German woman)
- (2024) Honoured at the World Summit of Women Leaders in Reykjavik
- (2024) Honoured as Personality of the Year at the AmCham Tributes Gala
- (2023) Honorary Doctorate from Australian Catholic University
- (2023) Appointed advisor to the Dicastery for Culture and Education
- (2021) Honorary Doctorate from the Institut Catholique de Paris
- (2020) Nominated ordinary member of Academia Europaea
- (2020) Awarded the Master de Oro de Alta Dirección by the Real Forum de Alta Dirección
- (2019) Doctor Honoris Causa by Boston College and Commencement Speaker
- (2019) Alumni Career Award by the University of Lisbon
- (2019) Women in Science Portugal
- (2013) ILVP Award, International Leadership Program, U.S. State Department
- (2012) Freeman Spogli Lecturer at Center for International Relations, Freeman Spogli Centre, Stanford University
- (Since 2010) Honorary Fellow at School of Advanced Studies of University of London
- (2007) Fellow at Wissenschaftskolleg, in Berlin
- (2001) Fulbright scholar at Western Michigan University

== Selected works ==
Her research is currently published in Portuguese, English, German, French, Italian and Spanish. She is the author of over 182 publications, bridging cultural theory, interarts studies, visual culture and culture and conflict.

=== Books ===
- (2018) Ballets Russes. Modern Times After Dhiaghilev, Lisboa: with PcPinto
- (2015) Hazardous Future: Disaster, Representation and the Assessment of Risk, New York, with Christoph Wulf.
- (2007). Mitografias. Figurações de Antígona, Cassandra e Medeia no Drama de Expressão Alemã do Século XX, Lisbon: Imprensa Nacional – Casa da Moeda.
- (2008). Fleeting, Floating, Flowing: Water Writing and Modernity, Würzburg
- (2011). Literacia Visual. Estudos sobre a Inquietude das Imagens, Lisboa.
- (2014). The Cultural Life of Money, De Gruyter
- (2015). Hazardous Future, De Gruyter
- (2016). Humanidade(s), Considerações Radicalmente Contemporâneas, Argumento Collection, Lisbon.

=== Edited books ===
- (2001). (with Teresa Seruya, Mónica Dias), Contradições Electivas. Actas do Colóquio Comemorativo dos 250 Anos do Nascimento de J.W.Goethe, Lisbon.
- (2003). (with Richard Trewinnard, Mª Laura Pires), Landscapes of Memory. Envisaging the Past/Remembering the Future , Lisbon.
- (2007). Poéticas da Navegação, Lisboa.
- (2008). Fleeting, Floating, Flowing. Water Writing and Modernity , Würzburg.
- (2009). Identidade Europeia. Identidades na Europa, Lisbon.
- (2010). (with Peter Hanenberg, Fernando Clara, Filomena Guarda), Kulturbau. Aufräumen, Einräumen, Ausräumen , Zurich.
- (2010). (with Peter Hanenberg, Fernando Clara, Filomena Guarda), Rahmenwechsel Kulturwissenschaften , Würzburg
- (2010). (with Manuel Cândido Pimentel), Simone de Beauvoir. Olhares Sobre a Mulher e o Feminino, Lisbon.
- (2012). (with Adriana Martins), Plots of War. Modern Narratives of Conflict, Series Culture and Conflict, Berlim, New York.
- (2013). (with Peter Hanenberg), Der literarische Europa-Diskurs , Würzburg.
- (2015). (with Helena Gonçalves Silva), The Cultural Life of Money, Series Culture and Conflict , Berlin, New York.
- (2015). (with Christoph Wulf), Hazardous Future: Disaster, Representation and the Assessment of Risk , New York.

=== Scientific articles ===
- (1994). Caos e Metamorfose: Uma Leitura da Dança na Obra de Hugo von Hofmannsthal]", Runa nº20, 2/93, pp.151–160 .
- (1995). "Antigonae – Antigone. Uma leitura de Hölderlin e Claus Bremer", Runa, nº22,2/1994, pp. 99–114.
- (2000). "Tot sein und atmen... O complexo de Antígona no romance Malina de Ingeborg Bachmann", Runa, nº23–24, 1995, pp. 309–325.
- (2000). „Poiesis, Tanz und Repräsen-Tanz. Zu Hugo von Hofmannsthals Ariadne auf Naxos", Colloquia Germanica, Bd. 33, 2/2000, pp. 149–162.
- (2000). "Antigone and Cassandra: Gender and Nationalism in German Literature", Orbis Litterarum. International Review of Literary Studies, Vol. 55, 2/2000, pp. 118–134.
- (2003). „Komm mit, o Schöne, Komm mit mir zum Tanze’ Die Geschlechtspolitik und die Ort des Tanzes in Texten J.W.Goethes", Runa, 28/1999-2000, pp. 131–148.
- (2006). „Schweig und tanze!” Textos no Limite da (Re)Presentação. A Palavra e o Gesto no Drama de Franz Werfel, Eberhard Pannwitz e Hugo von Hofmannsthal", Dedalus, nº 9, 2004, pp. 91–117.
- (2009). "O que significa Estudos de Cultura? Um diagnóstico cosmopolita sobre o caso da Cultura Alemã", Revista de Comunicação e Cultura, nº6, 2009, pp. 137–166.
- (2010). "The Visuality of Catastrophe in Ernst Jünger’s Der gefährliche Augenblick and Die veränderte Welt", Kulturpoetik, 10,1, 2010, pp.62–84.
- (2011). (with João Ferreira Duarte), Fluid Cartographies – New Modernities Special Monographic Issue, Journal of Romance Studies, Vol.11, Issue 1, Spring 2011.
- (2011). "Savages and Neurotics. Freud at the Colonial School", Journal of Romance Studies, Vol.11.3, 2011, pp. 27–42.
- (2011). "A Question of Scale? Lázló László Almásy's Desert Mapping and Its Postcolonial Rewriting" Journal of Romance Studies, Vol.11.1.
- (2011). "Fuss-Karrieren: Der Schuh von Baudelaire bis Warhol", Paragrana. Zeitschrift für historische Anthropologie 21.2, 2011, pp. 1–23.
- (2013). "Fragile Matters. Literature and the Scene of Torture" in New German Critique, 127, Feb. 2016, pp. 119–140.
- (2020). “The risky NPV of Literature in dos Passos and Pessoa”, REAL – Yearbook of English and American Literature.

=== Chapters in books ===
- (2002). "Bodies Beyond the Fall. The Allure of Dolls from Rilke to Salman Rushdie", in Ana Gabriela Macedo, Orlando Grossegesse (eds.), Re-Presentações do Corpo Re-Presenting the Body, Braga: Universidade do Minho, Centro de Estudos Humanísticos, pp. 47–66
- (2005). "Nemesi's City. Urban Casualties and the Modernist Novel", in Manfred Schmeling, Monika Schmitz-Emans (eds.), Modernist Landscapes, Würzburg: Königshausen & Neumann, pp. 215–232.
- (2006). "Jede Frau ist eine Tänzerin ... The Gender of Dance in Weimar Culture" in Christiane Schönfeld, Carmel Finnan (eds.), Practicing Modernity. Female Creativity and Weimar Germany, Würzburg: Königshausen & Neumann, pp. 218–241.
- (2007). "Die Schwere. Ein Versuch über Macht und Tanz" in Christoph Wulf, Gabriele Brandstetter (eds.), Tanz als Anthropologie, Munique: Wilhelm Fink Verlag, pp. 64–84.
- (2008). "Sentimental Physics: Gottfried Benn, Heisenberg, & Co." in Monika Schmitz-Emans, Manfred Schmeling (eds.), Literature and Science, Würzburg: Königshausen & Neumann, pp. 177–192.
- (2008). "Stemming the Tide ... Carl Schmitt and Ernst Jünger’s Reactionary Modernism" in António Sousa Ribeiro, Maria Irene Ramalho (eds.), Translocal Modernisms, Zurich: Peter Lang, pp. 185–212.
- (2009). "Le voyeur dans la nuit. L’esthétique nocturne d’Egar Allan Poe" in Alain Montandon (ed.), Promenades Nocturnes, Paris : L’Harmattan, pp. 61–84.
- (2011). "Monks, Managers and Celebrities. Refiguring the European University" in Barbie Zelizer (ed.), Making the University Matter, Londres: Routledge, pp. 73–83.
- (2012). "The Visual Literacy of Disaster in Ernst Jünger’s Photo Books" in Carsten Meiner, Kristin Veel (eds), The Cultural Life of Catastrophes and Crises, Berlin, New York: de Gruyter, pp. 147–176.
- (2012). "This is (Not) It! Rate, Rattle and Roll in the Struggle for Financial Narratives" in Ansgar Nünning, Kai Sicks (eds.), Turning Points. Concepts and Narratives of Change in Literature and Other Media, Berlin: de Gruyter, pp. 191–212.
- (2013). "The Risk Doctrine. On Money, Uncertainty and Literature" in Monika Schmitz-Emans, (ed), Literatur als Wagnis/Literature as Risk. DFG Symposium 2011, Berlin: de Gruyter, pp. 239–263.
- (2014). "Visual recall in the present. Critical nostalgia and the memory of empire in Portuguese culture" in Naomi Segal, Daniela Koleva (eds.), Cultural Literacy in Europe, London: Palgrave, 2014, pp. 25–52.
- (2015). "Smuggling Lust. On the Cultural Re-Turn of Luxury" in Anders Michelsen, Frederik Tygstrup (eds.): Socioaesthetics:Ambiance – Imaginary, Amsterdam: Brill Publishers, pp. 202–220.
- (2015). “(In)Visible Theory. Paul Auster and the Artist as Cultural Critic”, in Christiane Solte-Gresser, Manfred Schmeling (eds.): Raconter la théorie/Narrating Theory, Würzburg: Königshausen & Neumann, pp. 111–124.
- (2016). "Seeing Voice. On the Cinematic Politics of Representation" in Alexandra Lopes, Adriana Martins (eds.), Mediations of Disruption in Postconflict Cinema, London: Palgrave, pp. 154–168.
- (2017). “Cellulloid Consensus. A Comparative Approach to Film in Portugal During WWII” in Laura Lonsdale (ed): Oxford Companion to Iberian Culture, Oxford: Oxford University Press.
- (2018). “Lex Fugit. On Acts of Legibility”, Pepita Hesselberth, Esther Peeren orgs: Legibility in the Age of Signs and Machines, Brill Publishers, Leiden, pp. 97-112.
- (2018). “The compulsion to be cruel: Contemporary returns”, in Joan Resina, Christoph Wulf (eds): Repetition, Recurrence, Returns, Lexington Books: San Francisco, pp.125-136.
- (2020). “The Global Eye or Foucault Rewired. Security, control and scholarship in the 21st century”, Doris Bachmann-Medick, Jens Kugele, Ansgar Nuenning (eds.) Futures of the Study of Culture, de Gruyter, Berlin.
