= Catholic University of Portugal =

Private Portuguese university with four campuses

Universidade Católica Portuguesa
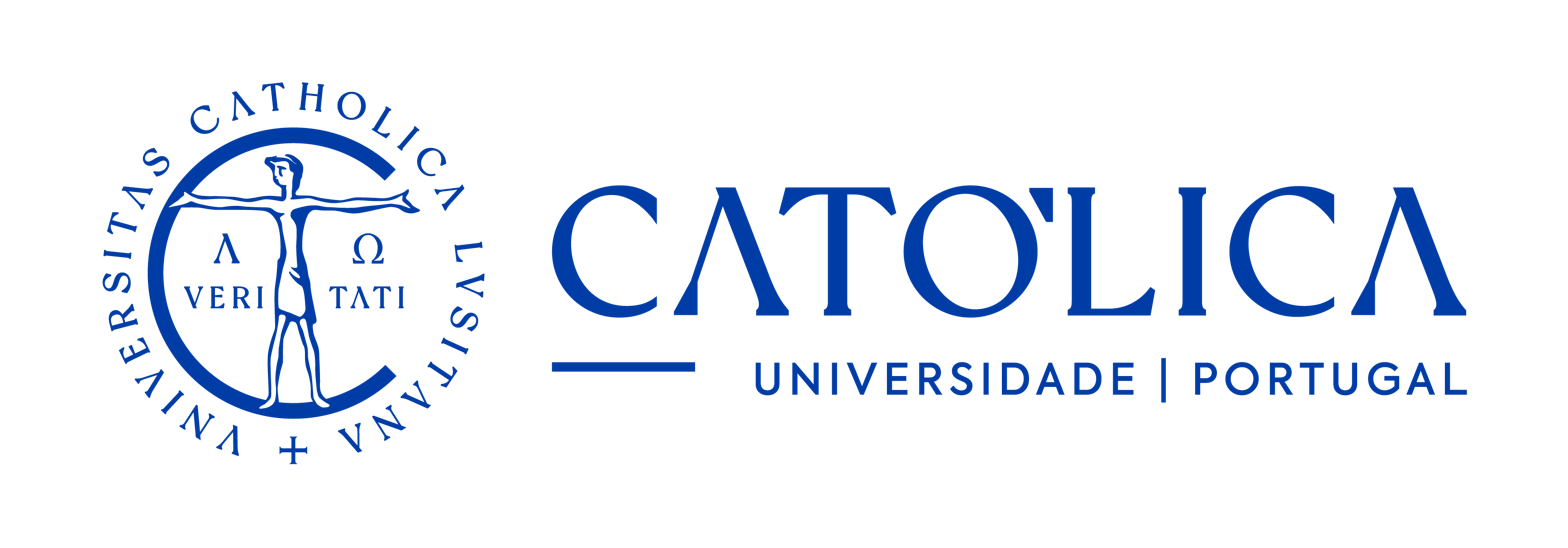
- Motto: The Value of Values
- Type: Concordat university
- Established: 1967
- President: Isabel Capeloa Gil
- Academic staff: 1,125
- Students: 13,154 Students (Degree-Granting Programmes) and +7,000 Postgraduate Students (Non Degree-Granting Programmes)
- Location: Lisbon (Headquarters); Porto Campus; Braga Campus; Viseu Campus, Portugal
- Website: www.ucp.pt

The Catholic University of Portugal (Portuguese: Universidade Católica Portuguesa), also referred to as Católica for short, is a non-state public university based in Lisbon with four campuses: Lisbon, Braga, Porto and Viseu.

The Holy See founded this higher educational establishment as a multi-site institution in 1967. It has a humanistic mission, and aims to provide high quality education, holistic development, cutting-edge knowledge and research, and innovations that serve the public interest. It also has a clear international focus.

Católica has over 20,000 students. The current and 6th President is Professor Isabel Capeloa Gil.

Until 2001, the Universidade Católica Portuguesa had a campus in Leiria, in 2007 in Figueira da Foz, with the Faculty of Science and Technology, and also in Caldas da Rainha, where it maintained a campus until 2011 focused on the Western Region, with the Faculty of Biotechnology.

== Notable people ==
=== Faculty ===
- Aníbal António Cavaco Silva
- Diogo Pinto de Freitas do Amaral
- José João de Freitas Barbosa Pereira Coutinho
- José Manuel Durão Barroso
- José Tolentino Calaça de Mendonça
- Marcelo Nuno Duarte Rebelo de Sousa
- Maria Alves da Silva
- Maria do Rosário Lopes Amaro da Costa
- Roberto Artur da Luz Carneiro

=== Alumni ===
- António Horta Osório
- António Luís dos Santos da Costa
- D. Manuel Clemente
- Isabel Jonet
- Paulo de Sacadura Cabral Portas
- Ricardo Araújo Pereira
- Sérgio Rebelo
- Vítor Louçã Rabaça Gaspar
- Vasco Palmeirim

== See also ==
- List of universities in Portugal
- Universidade Católica Portuguesa
