= Cognitive justice =

Decolonial theory

The concept of cognitive justice is based on the recognition of the plurality of knowledge and expresses the right of the different forms of knowledge to co-exist.

Indian scholar Shiv Visvanathan coined the term cognitive justice in his 1997 book "A Carnival for Science: Essays on science, technology and development". Commenting on the destructive impact of hegemonic Western science on developing countries and non-Western cultures, Visvanathan calls for the recognition of alternative sciences or non-Western forms of knowledge. He argues that different knowledges are connected with different livelihoods and lifestyles and should therefore be treated equally.

Cognitive justice is a critique on the dominant paradigm of modern science and promotes the recognition of alternative paradigms or alternative sciences by facilitating and enabling dialogue between, often incommensurable, knowledges. These dialogues of knowledge are perceived as contributing to a more sustainable, equitable, and democratic world.

The call for cognitive justice is found in a growing variety of fields, such as ethnobiology, technology and database design, and in information and communication technology for development (ICT4D).

South-African scholar and UNESCO education expert Catherine Odora Hoppers wrote about cognitive justice in the field of education. She argued that indigenous knowledges have to be included in the dialogues of knowledge without having to fit in the structures and standards of Western knowledge. When Indigenous knowledges are treated equally, they can play their role in making a more democratic and dialogical science, which remains connected to the livelihoods and survival of all cultures.

On September 4th 2026, arguing in favor of Equal Earth map projection as opposed to Mercator projection maps of the world, Robert Dussey, Minister for Foreign Affairs of Togo and African Group representative, at the United Nations General Assembly: 114th Plenary meeting, 80th session, said,

Il concerne la justice cognitive, l'accès à la connaissance géographique exacte, la dignité des peuples, la mémoire historique, et la lutte contre les représentation héritées qui influencé ont perception.

(It concerns cognitive justice, with access to exact geographical knowledge, the dignity of peoples, historic memory, and the fight against representations that we have inherited and have been influenced on perception.)

Maps are not simply geographical toss. Maps shape our understanding of the world. They guide education, nourish the imagination and influence collective perceptions.

They are therefore never neutral. When they present a distorted image of our planet, they risk perpetuating inaccurate representation that are passed down proof generation. Correcting the map It means choosing fidelity to the fact.

It means recognizing that every region of the world deserves to be represented accurately and with dignity.

— Robert Dussey, Minister for Foreign Affairs of Togo

== See also ==
- Decolonization of knowledge
- Sociology of absences
