= Maria Irene Ramalho =

Portuguese academic specialising in American studies and feminist studies

- Born: Maria Irene Ramalho de Sousa Santos
- Occupation: Academic
- Spouse: Boaventura de Sousa Santos
- Awards: Mary C. Turpie Prize, by the American Studies Association (ASA)

Maria Irene Ramalho de Sousa Santos, usually known as Maria Irene Ramalho, is a Portuguese professor emerita of American Studies and Feminist Studies at the Faculty of Arts of the University of Coimbra (FLUC), in Portugal, as well as a former Assistant Professor International in the Department of Comparative Literature at the University of Wisconsin-Madison, in the U.S. In 2008, she was the first non-American to be awarded the Mary C. Turpie Prize by the American Studies Association (ASA) for outstanding abilities and achievement in American studies teaching, advising, and program development, and in 2018, she received the Medal of Scientific Merit, awarded by the Ministry of Science, Technology and Higher Education of Portugal.

== Education ==
Maria Irene Ramalho de Sousa Santos completed a degree in Germanic Philology at the University of Coimbra in 1964. She then worked as an assistant at the university. Encouraged by her professor to pursue a PhD in American Studies so that he would not be dependent on visiting scholars from the USA, she attended Yale University in New Haven, Connecticut, USA beginning in 1968. There, as a student of the noted literary critic Harold Bloom, she obtained a PhD in American Studies in 1974 with a thesis entitled Poetry in Hesperia: Wallace Stevens and the Romantic Tradition. She had been a fellow of the Fulbright Program.

== Career ==
Between 1974 and 1986, Ramalho worked as an assistant professor at the University of Coimbra. In 1986, she was appointed an associate professor and was made a full professor in 1988. In 1982, she started to work as a visiting professor at the University of Wisconsin-Madison, making almost annual visits to that university from that time and being, since 1999, an International Affiliate of the Department of Comparative Literature. From 1984 to 1986, she was president of the Portuguese Anglo-American Studies Association. She also taught briefly at King's College London and the University of Macau.

Ramalho retired from the University of Coimbra in 2012, where she was professor at the Anglo-American Studies Section of the Faculty of Letters, but she continued to work with the University of Wisconsin-Madison. At the University of Coimbra, she was scientific coordinator of the doctoral programmes of both American studies and feminist studies and was a researcher at the Centre for Social Studies (CES).

Ramalho organized the first Portuguese master's course in Anglo-American Studies in 1982, the first master's course in American Studies in 1999, and the first study programme for Americans in Portugal in 2008. As chair of the programme committee for the third European Feminist Research Conference in 1997, she was also responsible for the establishment of Coimbra University's master's and PhD courses in feminist studies, starting in 2007.

In 1992, to commemorate the 100th anniversary of the death of Walt Whitman, she promoted the idea of International Poets Meetings in Coimbra. Held every three years, these meetings lasted over a period of 20 years and attracted more than three hundred poets, speaking more than forty languages, who read their work at various locations in the city.

== Personal life ==
Ramalho is married to the sociologist Boaventura de Sousa Santos, who has also been a professor at the University of Coimbra, founded the Centre for Social Studies (CES) at the same university and collaborated with the University of Wisconsin-Madison. The couple produced offspring.

== Publications ==
Ramalho has published extensively in Portuguese and in English on literature and culture (with special emphasis on the poetry of the USA), on American studies, and on feminist studies. Among her recent areas of interest are the topics of modernism and modernity. In addition to publishing, she serves on the editorial board of several literary and cultural journals. Her publications in English include:

=== Books ===
- 2008. Translocal Modernisms: International Perspectives (with António Sousa Ribeiro). Volume 3 of Transatlantic aesthetics and culture. Peter Lang Publishers.
- 2003. Atlantic Poets: Fernando Pessoa's Turn in Anglo-American Modernism. University Press of New England.

Ramalho has also edited six anthologies of world poetry.

=== Chapters in books ===
- 2020. What's in a Name?' Utopia - Sociology - Poetry, In Boaventura de Sousa Santos and Maria Paula Meneses (eds.), Epistemologies of the South. Knowledge Born in the Struggle. New York, NY. Routledge, 126-145
- 2003. Poetry in the Machine Age. In S. Bercovitch (ed.), The Cambridge History of American Literature. Cambridge University Press.
- 1999. American Studies as Traveling Culture: An Extravagant Nonnative'’s Wanderings in Global Scholarship. In Rob Kroes (ed.). Predecessors: Intellectual Lineages in American Studies. Amsterdam. Free University Press, 340-58.
- 1994. Introduction: The Canon in Anglo-American Studies. In Isabel Caldeira (ed.). O cânone nos Estudos Anglo-Americanos. Coimbra. Minerva.

=== Journal article ===
- 2017. The Private Is Public or Furbies Are Us. CES [Online], 27, 2017.

== Awards and honours ==
- In 2008, Ramalho was awarded the Mary C. Turpie Prize by the American Studies Association (ASA). She was the first foreigner to receive this award, which honours professors and researchers of excellent scientific merit in the teaching and researching of American studies and who have demonstrated outstanding skills and achievements in teaching.
- In 2017, Isabel Caldeira, Graça Capinha, and Jacinta Matos, professors at the Faculty of Arts of the University of Coimbra, organized the publication of The Edge of One of Many Circles in honour of Ramalho. This brings together articles by experts from various fields and poems of poets of various nationalities, as well as a section of testimonies in her honour.
- In 2018, Ramalho was awarded the Medal of Scientific Merit by the Ministry of Science, Technology and Higher Education of Portugal. The award was presented to her by prime minister António Costa.
