= Teddy Sandoval =

American artist (1949-1995)

- Born: Theodore Sandoval; 1949; Los Angeles, California, US
- Died: December 18, 1995 (aged 45); Los Angeles, California, US
- Other name: Rosa de la Montaña
- Education: California State University, Long Beach
- Occupation: Artist
- Years active: c. 1970–1995
- Known for: Ceramics, mail art, printmaking, performance art, photography
- Notable work: Gateway to Highland Park; Chili Chaps; La Historia de Frida Kahlo
- Movement: Chicano art, Mail art
- Partner: Paul Polubinskas (1977–2024)

Theodore "Teddy" Sandoval (1949 – December 18, 1995) was an American multimedia artist widely known for his presence in the mail art movement as the "Butch Gardens School of Art." Born and raised in Los Angeles, California, Sandoval's multidisciplinary works are inspired by and expressions of his life experiences as Chicano and queer.

== Early life and education ==
Sandoval was born in 1949 in Los Angeles to Petra Gaitán and Jesús Sandoval, who both immigrated to the United States from Puebla, Mexico. The youngest of five siblings, Sandoval was raised in East Lost Angeles near Salazar Park. Many buildings in this neighborhood, including his family's home on South Bonnie Beach Place, appear in his photography. He attended Garfield High School.

Sandoval received a BA in Printmaking from California State University, Long Beach (CSULB) in 1971. His early print works took inspiration from hippie imagery, Art Nouveau, and the aesthetics of the Victorian garden. His art was also influenced by queer community spaces (such as gay bars and beaches) in Long Beach, and the Chicano political activism happening in and around the university.

== Artworks and career ==
Sandoval worked in a number of artistic mediums throughout his life, including ceramics, sculpture, drawings, prints, photography, collage, and window dressings. He often combined these mediums in his works.

During the 1970s, Sandoval experimented with incorporating sand into his artworks. This included adhering sand to the surface of print works to create texture, and nestling smaller art pieces within plastic bags containing sand collected from maritime cruising locations in Los Angeles.

Sandoval commonly photographed local graffiti, including graffiti of his own. His photographs and tags were often in conversation with existing graffiti, specifically those which included homophobic language.

Sandoval's artwork blends aesthetics and imagery from Mesoamerican indigenous art, cholo subculture, Catholicism, and the American West, often in a homoerotic and campy manner. He also developed a repertoire of repeatedly-occurring images in his work, including disembodied limbs/genitals, palm trees, men's underpants, dice, Ionic columns, the Sacred Heart, and most notably the Castro clone (or other gay fashion subculture participant, such as a leatherman), often with no facial features save for a mustache.

Sandoval's art incorporates elements of rasquachismo, what Sandoval himself referred to as "barrio baroque", synthesizing motifs of Western art with artistic modes of the Chicano working class. His work simultaneously satirizes and interrogates gender roles (specifically machismo), homophobia and anti-Mexican racism, often through repurpose of stereotypical imagery, what he described as "derogatory, yet silly". One notable example are his series of collages in the style of the Mexican tabloid ¡Alarma!, often incorporating photographs of him and his friends as the subjects of their sensational narratives.

=== Collaborations ===
Sandoval had many collaborators within the Chicano art movement. While not a full member himself, he collaborated with members of the Chicano art collective Asco.

The performance piece La Historia de Frida Kahlo (1978) was both choreographed by and starred Sandoval and Asco member Gronk, with Sandoval as Frida Kahlo and Gronk as Diego Rivera. It was performed in and around the environs of LACE. Photographs of the work are stylistically similar to those of a fotonovela. Sandoval's Chili Chaps (1978) – a pair of cardboard chaps adorned with pinto beans, dried chilis (later replaced with ceramic copies), and embroidered with cacti and stereotypical imagery of Mexicans – appears as a set piece in the performance. Sandoval and Gronk would reuse photographs from La Historia in subsequent artworks, such as in Sandoval's ¡Alarma! collages, and Dos Fritos (1978), a collage parodying Kahlo's self-portrait and invocative of the Frito Bandito, a stereotypical Mexican mascot widely condemned by Chicano Movement participants.

In December 1975, Sandoval met artist Joey Terrill at an artistic gathering, the members of which would retroactively be named the Escandalosas, or "Scans." Sandoval and Terrill collaborated on a number of projects, namely the photograph collection The Maricón Series (c. 1975), and the performance piece Heartbreak Hotel (c. 1977–1978). Sandoval also contributed to Terrill's Homeboy Beautiful zine series.

Sandoval was a member of VIVA, Lesbian and Gay Latino Artists, a collective which promoted the visibility of queer latine artists and advocated for AIDS awareness in Los Angeles' queer networks.

Sandoval produced prints at community art center Self Help Graphics & Art, notably the serigraph Angel Baby (1995). Sandoval described the subject of the print, a winged boxer, as a guardian angel who is tasked with helping humanity to "change our thoughts within our hearts and our souls" to end "violence, AIDS, war, and discrimination of all kinds" and "to live in peace and harmony."

=== Butch Gardens School of Art (1970s–1980s) ===
Through the 1970s and early 1980s, Sandoval distributed his artworks to a wider network through the US postal service as part of the mail art movement, under the moniker "Butch Gardens School of Art," sometimes shortened to "Butch Gardens." Sandoval sent both unique and mass-produced (photocopied) artworks to his friends and correspondents, often in the postcard format. Mail sent by Sandoval as part of this project was often attributed to his drag persona, Rosa de la Montaña.

While the School itself did not occupy a set physical location, it was inspired by – and occasionally based in – a gay bar in Silver Lake. Butch Gardens exhibitions and gatherings were hosted at various venues, including Sandoval's studio. In addition to promoting artistic collaboration within his local connections, Sandoval's mail art also gained a national and international reach.

The "Butch Gardens" name is a homage to the New York Correspondence School, a mail art label for a similarly fantastical art school created by Ray Johnson, as well a play on both the queer slang for masculine gender expression and the name of the theme park Busch Gardens. "Rosa de la Montaña" is similarly a homage to Rrose Sélavy, the feminine persona of Marcel Duchamp.

=== Creative head at Ron's Records (1979–1984) ===
Sandoval was creative head at Ron's Records, a music retail business run by "Emperor of Los Angeles Gay Community" Ron Roth, between 1979 and 1984. First operating in Long Beach, the store expanded to Los Angeles in 1980 and San Francisco's Castro District in 1985. Sandoval created advertisements, decorations, window displays, merchandise, and a Pride parade float for Ron's Records. Bay Area musicians from Megatone Records, Fantasy Records, and Moby Dick Records visited the store for promotional events, for which Sandoval created extensive interior decor.

=== Artquake (1981–1994) ===
Through mutual connection with Ron Roth, Sandoval met Paul Polubinskas at LA nightclub Circus Disco in 1977. The two would go on to become lifelong partners.

Between 1981 and 1994, from their shared home in Highland Park, Sandoval and Polubinskas ran Artquake, a wall-glazing and interior design company though which Sandoval also sold his ceramic creations. Some of Sandoval's unique ceramic works were exhibited in galleries under the Artquake name.

=== Gateway to Highland Park (1994–2003) ===
In 1993, Sandoval was selected to participate as an artist contributor to the Los Angeles Metro Rail's Art for Rail Transit (ART) program. His installation, Gateway to Highland Park, was created for the Southwest Museum station.

The installation augmented both the area surrounding the station and the platform itself. Sandoval designed elements to invoke the movement of the Arroyo Seco River, most notably through the use of crushed blue glass aggregate to create the image of an undulating waterway on the floor of the platform. In addition to cast aluminum armchairs with fern designs, seating structures include boulders, enlarged column capitals and dice, askew and partially "submerged" into the floor. The platform is surrounded by three ceramic "guardians" on classical columns. Each "guardian" is a cylindrical figure coated with glass mosaic tiles, accessorized with steel wings and a crown. The "guardians" are also equipped with sculpted pairs of human arms, each pointing in the direction of a different location linked by the former Gold Line: Pasadena, Union Station, and the Southwest Museum.

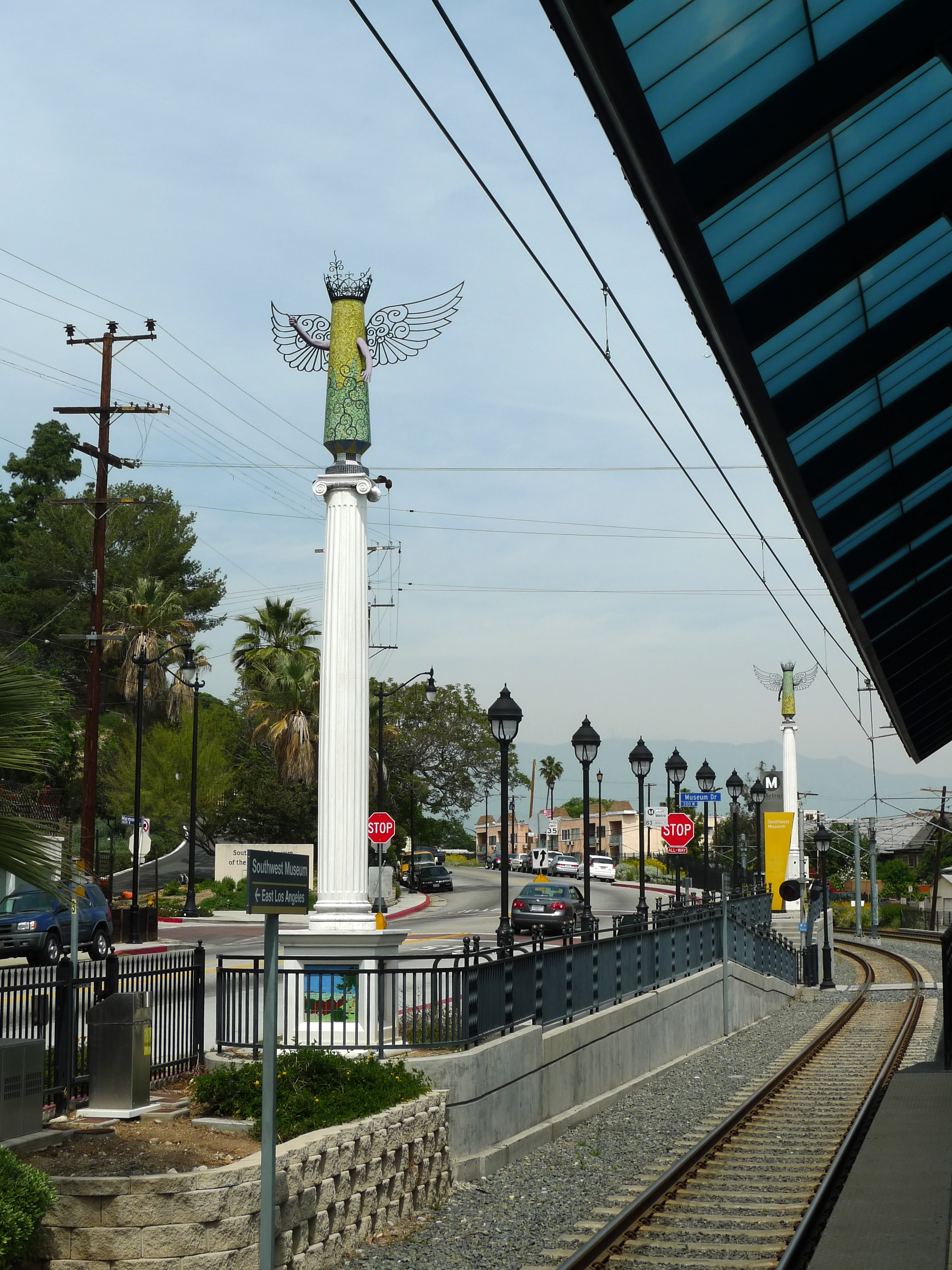
View of two "guardian" statues created by Sandoval for the Southwest Museum station.

Sandoval also contributed his abilities as a ceramicist to other public art installations at Los Angeles Metro Rail stations. Using his home kiln, he created tiles for the Hollywood/Vine Station designed by Gilbert Luján, and for the work designed by Roberto Gil de Montes for the Paseo César Chavez installation at Union Station.

Rising costs of the railway's construction delayed the artwork's installation, creating uncertainty for the future of the project. Sandoval would pass away from AIDS-related complications before the Southwest Museum Station was completed. After his death Polubinskas took custody of Sandoval's estate, including copyright of his artwork, through which he pushed the MTA to continue the project. With continued support from Highland Park residents and Gabrielino-Shoshone Nation Chief Ya’Anna Vera Rocha, the project was allowed to proceed, ultimately to be completed in 2003.

== Exhibitions ==
=== Contemporary ===
- Chicanarte, Los Angeles Municipal Art Gallery, c.1970-1975.
- Chicano Art: Resistance and Affirmation, 1965-1985.
- Escandalosas!, Hazard Gallery (Los Angeles), 1975.
- ¡No Más Nos Dieron Tres Días!, California State University, Long Beach, 1976.
- Schizophrenibeneficial, Mechicano Art Center, 1977.
- Testimonios de Latinoamérica, Carrillo Gil Museum, Carillo Gil Art Museum, 1978.
- Corazón Herido, Butch Gardens School of Art,1979.
- Recent Paintings on Paper by Rosa de la Montaña and Teddy, A Different Light, 1984.
- American Pop Culture Images Today, Laforet Museum, 1987.
- Teddy Sandoval: One Man Show, Wild Blue Gallery, 1989.
- Images of Hope: Latino Artists Against AIDS, Santa Monica Museum of Art, 1991.
- Altar por la Familia, Craft and folk Art Museum, 1991.
- A Mexican Legacy, Riverside Art Museum, 1992.
- Contemporary Latino Americano Artists, Cerritos College, 1993.

=== Posthumous ===
- Teddy Sandoval, LA Artcore, 1994.
- Images in the Community, Galeria Otra Vez, 1994.
- Joteria: VIVA's Parody to Loteria Exhibit, A Different Light, 1994.
- New Visions for Historic Neighborhoods, Occidental College, 1995.
- East of the River, Santa Monica Museum of Art, 2000.
- Chicano Art for our Millennium: Collected Works from the Arizona State University Community, Mesa Southwest museum, 2003.
- Asco: Elite of the Obscure, A Retrospective, LACMA, 2011-2013.
- Axis Mundo: Queer Networks in Chicano L.A., ONE National Gay & Lesbian Archives, 2017-2021.
- Arte Sin Fronteras: Prints from the Self Help Graphics Studio, Blanton Museum of Art, 2019.
- In Your Face: Chicano Art After CARA, AltaMed Art Collection, 2022-2023.
- L.A. Memo: Chicana/o Art From 1972-1989, LA Plaza de Cultura y Artes, 2022-2023.
- Traitor, Survivor, Icon: The Legacy of La Malinche, Denver Art Museum, 2022-2023.
- Xican-a.o.x. Body, American Federation of Arts, 2023-2024.
- Teddy Sandoval and the Butch Gardens School of Art, Independent Curators International in collaboration with Vincent Price Art Museum, 2025.

== See also ==
- Mail art
- Queer Chicano art
- Asco (art collective)
- Chicano Art, Resistance and Affirmation
