= Les Petites Bon-Bons =

Group of conceptual/life artists

Les Petites Bons-bons mail art to Lucy Lippard, 197-, mail art, various media; 31 x 23 cm.

Les Petites Bon-Bons was a group of conceptual/life artists that originated in Milwaukee, Wisconsin, in the early 1970s. Their activities spanned the nascent gay activist movement, the international correspondence network and the Hollywood glitter rock scene. They are known largely by the work of Jerry Dreva and Robert Lambert, aka Jerry and Bobby Bonbon, and who achieved much of their fame by effectively manipulating major media outlets.

== Early history ==
Les Petites Bon-Bons was originally coined as the name of a review to be staged by a group of young gay activist friends called the Radical Queens, veterans of the local Milwaukee counterculture and gay liberation scene, but it was never produced. In the hands of Dreva and Lambert, the group identity became a vehicle for the synthesis of art, politics, and sex that concerned them at the time. In addition to Dreva and Lambert, other members included Chuckie Betz, Gary Pietrzak, Mark Slizewski, Dick Varga, and Jim Sullivan.

== Rock and Roll ==
Although other sub-identities became associated with the name, such as a fictional drum and bugle corps, the Bon-Bons became known mainly as a conceptual rock band. Although they had no musical abilities and had never played a concert, Jerry and Bobby encouraged the notion among the rock journalists they befriended when they moved to Los Angeles, in June 1973 and January 1974, respectively. Personal links were formed with David Bowie, Iggy Pop, Lou Reed, Sylvester, and many others in the rock world.

== Correspondence art ==
Dreva and Lambert had begun sending art projects to artists and writers they admired in early 1971, generating responses from noted critic Jack Burnham, writer and gay activist Arthur Bell, and eventually generating an invitation to Richard Kostelanetz’s ASSEMBLING series, through which they became aware of the formal network of international artists known as The Eternal Network. These included Ray Johnson, the Western Front, General Idea and FILE megazine, Clemente Padin in Uruguay and COUM/Throbbing Gristle in the UK. Their art incorporated camp (style) and the aesthetics of glam rock. Les Petites Bon-Bons used art to create an alternative to the mainstream masculinity of the Gay liberation movement. The Bon-Bons's medium, mail art, contributed to their identification with counterculture. Their work mainly consisted of collage on photocopied texts and images. During the group's period in Los Angeles they became connected to a community of experimental Chicano artists also involved with mail art, including Gronk (artist), Harry Gamboa Jr., and Teddy Sandoval, among others.

== Legacy ==
The Bon-Bons were active for only four years, disbanding in 1975. The work of Les Petites Bon-Bons was featured in the traveling exhibition "Axis Mundo: Queer Networks in Chicano L.A.," which was on view from 2017 to 2022.

The Pet Shop Boys mention the group in their 2024 single "A new bohemia" from the album "Nonetheless".
