= Mundo Meza =

Edmundo Meza (July 19, 1955 - February 11, 1985), also known as Mundo Meza, was an artist and activist who was born in Tijuana, Mexico and grew up in East Los Angeles. He discovered his passion for the area's avant-garde culture in early 1970. As an emerging artist, Mundo Meza worked for shoe designer Fred Slatten on Santa Monica Boulevard as a window dresser. He also painted unique designs onto Slatten's platform shoes, gathering a celebrity clientele which included Cher, Elton John, and Diana Ross.

Meza collaborated with style icon Simon Doonan and together they created provocative window displays for West Hollywood's Maxfield Bleu. Their brash reportage art combined vintage mannequins, luxury goods, and objects from prop houses, often evoking controversy and strong reactions. One such display satirized a news story about a coyote stealing a child. The hysteria erupted even more for using a taxidermy coyote.

Mundo played a pivotal role in the emergence of Chicano conceptualists which included Robert Legorreta (Cyclona), Joey Terrill, Teddy Sandoval, Jack Vargas and members of the collective Asco led by Harry Gamboa, Jr., Gronk, Willie Herrón, and Patssi Valdez. His work was highly influenced by the Chicano artistic community which has recently started to receive public recognition due to its panache, confrontational aesthetics, and extravagance.

He died in 1985 due to complications from AIDS.

== Education ==
Meza graduated from Huntington Park High School in 1973 with a scholarship to Otis Art Institute.

== Career ==
Mundo Meza had a multidisciplinary practice that encompassed an array of different fields including painting, design, fashion, and installation. Initially, all of his work responded directly to the issues of society, and through his use of mesoamerican imagery, Meza was able to contextualize within the gay liberation movement.

Meza is widely known for his collaborations with Robert Legorreta (Cyclona) and Gronk during the early 1970s. His work included a number of confrontational performances in East Los Angeles, including, Caca-Roaches Have No Friends. His early practice combined Chicano Nationalism with visual panache and psychedelic experimentation in order to enunciate the ideology behind his work.

From 1976 to 1978, Meza danced with the Aisha Dance Company. He performed, with his long time partner Carlos “Charles” Docando for the opening of the King Tut exhibit at the Los Angeles County Museum of Art in March 1978.

In the early 1980s, Meza collaborated with British designer Simon Doonan, producing surreal and shocking window displays for Maxfield Bleu in West Hollywood and other Melrose Avenue boutiques. Parody and satire were a common theme which set them apart from other displays.

By 1983, his work became increasingly lyrical and abstract. Most of his paintings depicted the Chicano Body as a site for subversion and were calm simplified compositions. This change in tone was his method of using modernist abstraction in order to shed light on a new dialectic figure of queerness in the face of AIDS.

== Legacy ==
In 2014 and 2015, the Getty Foundation awarded grants totaling $270,000 for exhibition research, support, and implementation of Axis Mundo: Queer Networks in Chicano L.A. Organized by the ONE National Gay & Lesbian Archives at the University of Southern California Libraries, the exhibition takes its name from Meza's work and focuses on queer, Chicanx artists and their collaborations from the late 1960s to the early 1990s. The exhibit was first shown at the ONE Archives' gallery and the Museum of Contemporary Art in Los Angeles before traveling to several galleries across the United States. Co-curators C. Ondine Chavoya and David Evans Frantz worked for four years, on behalf of the ONE National Gay & Lesbian Archives at the University of Southern California to assemble and research the collection for the exhibition, spending time in Mexico, Spain, and England.

== Posthumous exhibitions ==
- Asco: Elite of the Obscure, A Retrospective, 1972–1987, Los Angeles County Museum of Art, 2011
- Cruising the Archive: Queer Art and Culture in Los Angeles, 1945–1980, ONE National Gay & Lesbian Archives, 2011
- MEX/LA: Mexican Modernisms in Los Angeles 1930-1985, Museum of Latin American Art, 2011
- Axis Mundo: Queer Networks in Chicano L.A., ONE National Gay & Lesbian Archives, 2017

== See also ==
- Queer Chicano art
