= Robert Legorreta =

American performance artist

Robert Legorreta (born September 15, 1952), known by his performance name Cyclona, is an American performance artist. He is known for disruptive public performances that often expressed radical political views on gender roles and sexuality during the Chicano Civil Rights Movement. He was a participant in the East Los Angeles artist group Asco. He retired from performance in 2004.

== Early life ==
Legorreta was born in El Paso, Texas in 1952 to a working class family of Mexican and Basque heritage. As an infant, his family moved to East Los Angeles, into a Mexican American community. Legorreta attended Garfield High School in East Los Angeles in the late 1960s, where he sang in the glee club. As a teenager, he participated in activist protests including the East L.A. walkouts in 1968, a student-led protest against sub-standard conditions and racism in the public education system in East L.A. and the Chicano Moratorium Against the Vietnam War. At Garfield High School, Legorreta participated in classmate Harry Gamboa Jr'.s art collective "Tree People," and joined the Chicano art group "Doc’s People", which was composed of visual artists, musicians, and performers who were connected to other young artists in East L.A., including Mundo Meza who became a close friend and collaborator. His classmates included future members of the art group Asco.

== Work ==
At fourteen, Legorreta began performing on the major streets of East L.A. as what he has called a "psychedelic creature", in make-up, women's clothes including psychedelic jumpsuits, and two water balloons hung around his neck as fake breasts. As performances were sometimes met with hostility from the public, Legorreta realized the political potential of his performances and "started doing drag so I could upset people". These early performances of the late 1960s informed his performance persona Cyclona, a drag character with thick black eye-makeup, over-done lipstick, and often a scowling expression. Art historian Robb Hernández observes Cyclona was an homage to pachuca Chicana style of the 1940s.

Cyclona officially debuted in November 1969 in Caca-Roaches Have No Friends (written by artist friend Gronk), a play staged in Belvedere Park in East L.A. Cyclona appeared in white face make-up, a nightgown, and a fur around her neck, and danced and mimed. In her culminating scene, Cyclona stripped a male performer to reveal a water balloon "phallus", then bit and popped the balloon in a mock-fellatio "cock scene". The newspaper Belvedere Citizen had inaccurately advertised the art performance as a play for the "whole family", and the unsuspecting audience responded by shouting and throwing items at the performers; police tried to shut down the performance and the performers ran from the stage.

Legorreta is also an avid collector of popular culture items and ephemera that include Latino themes and images, such as a Pez candy dispenser with the head of Speedy Gonzalez, and "Cha-Cha" records by Sam Cooke (1969) and Ethel Smith (ca. 1950). His collection of print ads, wrappers, toys, and hundreds of LPs are archived, along with his correspondence and documentation of his artistic career, at the Chicano Studies Research Center at UCLA. Legorreta created scrapbooks and collages using some of these materials, organized as narratives that show the artist's critical and historical concerns, according to art historian Robb Hernández.

== Exhibitions ==
- Asco: Elite of the Obscure, 1972-1987, traveling exhibition, 2011-12.
- Axis Mundo: Queer Networks in Chicano L.A., traveling exhibition, 2017-22.
