= Terry Schoonhoven =

American muralist and painter (1945–2001)

- Born: Terry Lee Schoonhoven; 1945; Freeport, Illinois
- Died: 2001 (age 56)
- Education: University of Wisconsin, Madison; UCLA
- Style: Realist; Contemporary
- Awards: National Foundation for the Arts (fellowship); Louis Comfort Tiffany Foundation; Rose Award for Best Public Artwork; Graham Foundation

Terry Schoonhoven (1945-2001) was an American muralist, lithographer, and painter. Interested in the environment, architecture, film, history, geography, and the fluidity of time, he painted more than 40 large scale public murals over the course of his career, including six as co-founder of the LA Fine Arts Squad. His work -- "terrifying by the intensity of its reality and powerful associative qualities"—often explored dystopic environmental themes.

== Early life and education ==
Terry Lee Schoonhoven was born to Peggy Ann and Harold Schoonhoven in 1945. Raised in Freeport, Illinois, he was drawn to books that reproduced the paintings of old masters, and began painting as a child. At 10, his work was exhibited at an event sponsored by the Freeport Historical Society and at 11 his paintings were displayed at a regional art show.

Schoonhoven attended the University of Wisconsin. In 1967, after receiving a BS in art, he moved to Los Angeles, where he did graduate work and taught lithography at UCLA.

== Career ==
=== 1969-1974: The LA Fine Arts Squad ===
The LA Fine Arts Squad began as a partnership between Schoonhoven and Victor Henderson. They believed that art should be freely available to the public rather than limited to museums and galleries. Schoonhoven wrote: "To continue painting away in the isolation of the artist studio while the most exciting and innovative events of the decade were happening in the street was to miss the whole point of the sixties." In 1969 they founded the LA Fine Arts Squad. They were later joined by Leonard Koren and Jim Frazin, two of Schoonhoven's lithography students at UCLA.

The LA Fine Arts Squad's first project was Brooks Street Painting, a 19’ x 25’ enamel on stucco painting on the exterior wall of Henderson’s studio that mirrored Brooks Street in Venice. The mural was used as the backdrop of a Henry Diltz publicity photo of The Doors in 1971.

While the Fine Arts Squad worked on the Brooks Street Painting, they were approached to paint the exterior of a nightclub on La Cienega Boulevard, a major north-south arterial road in Los Angeles. Titled Beverly Hills Siddartha, the mural took more than a year, 200 gallons of painter's enamel, and $12,000. to complete. In an article in Newsweek, Beverly Hills Siddartha was described as "the masterpiece of a uniquely Californian group of street artists". (In the same article, the LA Fine Arts Squad is referred to as "young, tightly knit, and looking something like a rock group.")

Venice in the Snow, a 20' by 69' mural, was finished in 1970. With little financial support, the Fine Art Squad sold shares of the painting for $5.00 per square foot. The mural was obscured by new construction in 1972. Their next collaboration, a 9' × 40' bulletin enamel, plywood, and Styrofoam submarine, floated on Balboa Bay as an exhibit at Orange County's Newport Harbor Museum.

Isle of California, West Los Angeles, California, 1971

Completed in 1971, the LA Fine Arts Squad's best-known mural, Isle of California, was a 42' x 65' apocalyptic trompe-l'oeil mural depicting California in the aftermath of a major earthquake. A "crowning achievement of realist muralism," it was painted on the back wall of the Village Recorder in West Los Angeles. The Los Angeles Times reported that Isle of California, commissioned by Geordie Hormel, "caused a sensation" when it was completed. Schoonhoven and Henderson took a six-week break from Isle of California to paint Hippie Know How, a 19' x 15' mural shown during the Biennale de Paris.

The LA Fine Arts Squad disbanded in 1974; their final mural as a collaborative was Ghost Town, a 14’ x 30’ trompe l'oeil in Thousand Oaks.

=== 1975-2001: Later career and solo work ===
St. Charles Painting, Venice, California, 1979

Although he worked with Henderson and artists including Michael Davis, Schoonhoven worked largely on his own after the Fine Arts Squad disbanded. His 1979 mural, St. Charles Painting, was among his most acclaimed. A mirror image of a street scene on Venice's Windward Avenue, Schoonhoven said: "It functions as a large empty stage set with real people acting out their lives in front of it." A mural Schoonhoven painted during the same time period, Downtown LA Under Water, was similarly praised. "A monumental painting that seemed to represent a hallucinatory mix of conditions", it was first exhibited in a solo show at ARCO Center for Visual Art and later during the opening of LACMA's contemporary wing. His 1982 mural, White City—a "mythological white−walled city where clear blue skies and an ominous frozen silhouette rise above architectural structures", was commissioned by CSU Long Beach. The mural's completion coincided with the exhibit Vapor Dreams in L.A.: Terry Schoonhoven’s Empty Stage.

Along with artists including Kent Twitchell, Judy Baca, Frank Romero, Glenna Avila, John O. Wehrle, and Alonzo Davis, Schoonhoven was commissioned to paint a mural for the freeway project that commemorated Los Angeles as the host city for the 1984 Summer Olympics. Working above the Harbor Freeway—and using Keim mineral paint—Schoonhoven painted Roman ruins and Greek sculpture in the foreground of a mirror image of the downtown Los Angeles skyline. In 1993, he was commissioned by the Los Angeles County Metropolitan Transportation Authority to create a mural at Union Station. Working with tile on an end wall facing a staircase, the mural used a device that made the wall disappear; he used a similar device to create a false corridor mural at LACMA in 1981.

Schoonhoven continued to paint illusionistic murals that explored time, geography, the environment and Los Angeles throughout the 1990s. In 1999, he was privately commissioned to create a 12-by-71-foot historical panorama of Jewish physicians and scientists at Cedars Sinai Medical Center. In an interview with the LA Times, he said: “When the Fine Arts Squad began, this was the kind of art we pitted ourselves against,” he said. “But that was 25 years ago. As the years go by, you find that the revolution isn’t so important. I still have the same joy in terms of painting, and I love history. Maybe it’s my destiny to take something that seems stodgy and find a way to bring it to life again.”

== Legacy ==
In addition to LACMA, Schoonhoven's work has been exhibited at museums including the Los Angeles Museum of Contemporary Art, the Walker Art Center, San Antonio Museum of Art, the Smithsonian Museum of American Art, and the Crocker Art Museum, among others. An LA Fine Arts Squad retrospective was held at the Cardwell Jimmerson Contemporary Art Gallery in 2011; it included two dozen images and drawings by Schoonhoven and Henderson. Under the Big Black Sun, a 2012 exhibit at the Museum of Contemporary Art, featured Downtown LA Underwater. Critic Connie Butler wrote: "This watery landscape of a post-tsunami Los Angeles stands in for a powerful history of public murals all over the city. " His papers are archived at the Smithsonian.

== Personal life ==
Schoonhoven and his wife, Sheila Maidan Schoonhoven, a dancer and ceramicist, lived in the Larchmont neighborhood in Los Angeles. They had two children. He died of melanoma in 2001.
