= Joey Terrill =

American visual artist (born 1955)

- Born: October 5, 1955 (age 70); Los Angeles, California, United States
- Education: Immaculate Heart College, California State University, Los Angeles
- Known for: Painting, collage, drawing, photography
- Movement: Chicano art movement
- Website: www.joeyterrillart.com

Joey Terrill (born October 5, 1955) is an American Chicano queer visual artist. He works in the mediums of painting, collage, drawing, and photography. His work often pays tribute to gay visual artist, and features Chicano themes. Terrill uses inspiration from cartoons, magazines, 1950s and 1960s art movements, and comics to produce his work. He is based in Los Angeles.

== Early life and education ==
Joey Terrill was born on October 5, 1955 in Los Angeles, California, to parents of Mexican descent. He grew up as a second-generation Los Angeleno in Highland Park. Terrill went to a Catholic all-boys school, where he found his interest in Chicano political movements.

Terrill met artist Corita Kent when he was young, which influenced his decision to attend Immaculate Heart College, even though she was no longer teaching at the school during his attendance. He received a BFA degree (1976) from Immaculate Heart College; and received a MFA degree (2001) from California State University, Los Angeles.

== Career ==
In 1969, Terrill became familiar with the Metropolitan Community Church (MCC) and the Stonewall Riots by reading the Los Angeles Free Press. The MCC introduced him to various members of the queer community, where he met Teddy Sandoval and Edmundo Meza. Together, they created art, and participated in local activism.

Terrill and Sandoval began a close working artistic relationship, both inspired by their queer and Chicano identities. In the late 1970s, Terrill created The Maricón Series portrait series, in which he made tee shirts with the self-descriptor "maricon" to question the word's meaning and context.

Terrill was also fascinated by painting and painted various titles including He Used to Untie My Shoes (1978), If I Were Rich, I’d Buy My Lover Expensive Gifts (1980–1982), He Wore Ray Ban Glasses, a Rolex Watch, and He Used to Eat My Ass (1985).

From 1980 to 1981, Terrill moved to New York City but eventually returned home to Los Angeles. At the time, the AIDS epidemic had recently broken out, affecting his closest friends and community. In 1989, Terrill tested positive for HIV. Overcome by the deaths surrounding him, Terrill moved to activism to help his local community. During this time, Terrill also focused on creating work for the Chicano gay community, such as Chicos Modernos, an AIDS educational comic book written in Spanish. Terrill's art from 1989 still reemerged almost twenty years later, such as in his piece Remembrance (For Teddy and Arnie) (2008) based on his original painting Remembrance (1989).

After the 1990s, Terrill's work reflected his community and everyday life. He also used 35mm photography connecting memory, storytelling, and themes of persistence.

Terrill lives in Los Angeles and is the director of global advocacy and partnerships for the AIDS Healthcare Foundation. His work can be found in museum collections, including at the Hammer Museum, and the Museum of Modern Art.

== Work and exhibitions ==
=== "Homeboy Beautiful" (1979) ===
Acting as a defiance to machismo culture, Terrill wrote a zine dedicated to the representation of Chicano gay men. While only two editions and one-hundred copies sold, the zines still received cult status. In both zines, there are fashion sections with "Ask Lil Loca," sections that give popular cholo fashion advice and sections for art submissions. In the zines, Terrill wrote about "homo-homeboys" who were gang-affiliated Chicano men with internalized homophobia.

=== "Axis Mundo: Queer Networks in Chicano L.A." (2017) ===
Organized by ONE National Gay & Lesbian Archives in partnership with The Museum of Contemporary Art, Los Angeles for Pacific Standard Time: LA/LA, Axis Mundo: Queer Networks in Chicano L.A., presented art, music, and performance by queer Chicano/a artists in Los Angeles from the 1960s to the early 1990s. The Maricón Series (1975) and Homeboy Beautiful (1979) were featured.

Once Upon a Time: Paintings 1981–2015 (2021)

=== "Joey Terrill: Cut and Paste" (2023) ===
From January 19 to February 25, 2023, Terrill premiered his work Cut and Paste, showcasing his collage work from the 1970s to today. The exhibition was held by [./Https://www.ortuzar.com Ortuzar], a gallery in Tribeca, New York. His work, using various materials, draws inspiration from Sister Corita Kent. In the middle of the gallery was a fixture of a Xerox machine called It's Halloween Party Time from the late 1990s, displaying artifacts from parties he held at the peak of the AID Crisis. Other works in the exhibit included When I Was Young (1993), Homeboy Beautiful (1979), and Here I am / Estoy Aquí (2022).
