= Asco (art collective) =

East Los Angeles Chicano artist collective

Asco was an East Los Angeles based Chicano artist collective, active from 1972 to 1987. Asco adopted its name as a collective in 1973, making a direct reference to the word's significance in Spanish ("asco"), which is disgust or repulsion. Asco's work throughout 1970s and 1980s responded specifically to socioeconomic and political problems surrounding the Chicano community in the United States, as well the Vietnam War. Harry Gamboa Jr., Glugio "Gronk" Nicandro, Willie F. Herrón III and Patssi Valdez form the core members of the group.

== Origins ==
=== Political and cultural influences ===
A lot of our friends were coming back in body bags and were dying, and we were seeing a whole generation come back that weren't alive anymore. And in a sense that gave us nausea ... that is Asco, in a way.

— Gronk

The term Asco functions as a means of contextualizing and responding to the effects of the Vietnam War. This era, which art historian Arthur C. Danto has described as an era of revulsion, compelled young people to seek a new vocabulary for opposition through the growing importance of media, the impact of public mobilization, and new modes drawn from Happenings and spontaneous "be-ins". Socio-economic and regional factors additionally gave rise to revulsion. The shifting landscape of East Los Angeles during the 70s was particularly influential in Asco's work. The construction of freeway interchanges and the retention of walls dividing formerly connected neighborhoods fostered a hostile environment. Asco as a group was part of what Raul Homero Villa deems the "expressway generation", a generation aware and affected by how public policies and urban planning could create conditions of disparity and stratification both economically and geographically.

Last year at this time I was very active in the affairs of my community. I was deeply bothered and disgusted with the condition of my community and of the Mexican American people. I learned to distrust and dislike everything that was pro-establishment.—Harry Gamboa Jr., 1969.

Mr. Gamboa has described the members as "self-imposed exiles" who felt the best methods of artistic freedom and solidarity with the Mexican-American cause was to reject the political structures and mainstream stereotypes of modern Mexican art culture. Asco's emphasis on street culture and media hoaxes illustrates the merging of performance art with activism and protest. Asco occupies a unique place in the cultural landscape of Los Angeles. It deviated from the heavy nationalism of the Chicano Muralism movement to instead occupy a balanced position between the mainstream and its counter-movement.

=== Artistic influences ===
Some heavy influences of Asco art were Dada and Arte Povera. They used similar methods of recycling and appropriation to make something entirely different in meaning and form.

== Historical context in East LA ==
"Geographically and culturally segregated from the then-embryonic L.A. contemporary art scene and aesthetically at odds with the dominant Chicano nationalism, at times Asco found a home in the new, interdisciplinary, artist-run spaces like Los Angeles Contemporary Exhibitions (LACE). On other occasions they chose to bypass galleries and museums altogether, and exhibit and perform in the streets."

"We only know the east side, we don't really know the west side and the west side doesn't know us." – Willie Herrón

Los Angeles has little sense of the past or of place. A partial explanation for this is that Euroamericans have devoted little time or energy to learning the history of the region, treating that history much the same as they do learning other languages ... However, there are other reasons for [Mexicans] lack of visibility in Los Angeles history. Until recently, Mexicans in L.A., unlike their counterparts in San Antonio, did not have sufficient numbers to affect the politics of the city or even the Catholic Church, to which a majority of them belong. In addition, the vastness of the city and lack of cheap transportation have made it imperative for Mexicans, like other working-class Angelenos at the bottom of the wage scale, to live close to work ... The city's addiction to urban renewal projects has also resulted in the dispersal of Mexicans throughout the city via displacement of working-class renters. Even homeowners were not immune to massive projects, which uprooted entire Mexican neighborhoods to make sure that the suburbs had freeways ...

== Additional members ==
In addition to the core members, the following notable artists were also involved with Asco at one point or another:

- Robert Beltran
- Robert Legorreta (Cyclona)
- Jerry Dreva
- Diane Gamboa
- Mundo Meza
- Humberto Sandoval
- Ruben Zamora

== Community and method ==
Asco's aesthetic proposals were principally informed by questions that dealt with the way in which U.S. national politics affected the Chicano community, which they culturally identified with, and addressed through their works. That said, Asco really defied older Chicano methods of artistic resistance against exclusion. There was a considerable amount of anti-Chicano propaganda through mainstream journalism and commercial television therefore creating within Asco an artistic response that would counter the saturation of negative images about the Chicano movement. They decided to create works which were concerned with socioaesthetic modes such as violence and street life. The surreal nature of the work jarred the sensibilities of the traditionalist audience. Their methods evolved and tried to move away from the static nature of Muralism towards performance where they had public displays of what they called no emotion, and finally these performances were conceptualized for their new photographic genre of the No Movie. The sequence of No Movies was conceptualized by Gamboa as a fotonovela, like a comic book illustrated with photographs. The implication of the No Movies' merging of protocinematic performance and the still image into which it was condensed becomes evident when we contrast it with the murals which they were initially constructed against. Asco's work had a transient nature along with the poverty of their means, and their aestheticization of everyday barrio life they signaled a critique of the Murals commitment to durability, idealized imagery, and at some times the use of expensive paint. Therefore, with all this in mind the singularity of the photographs found in the No Movies gesture towards a narrative yet unlike industrialized and glamorized Hollywood they are Imperfect, materially limited alluding by that to their political situation.

== Works ==
=== Regeneración (1971) ===
Gamboa, Gronk, Herron, and Valdez's first collaboration was Regeneración, a journal propagating Chicano cultural and political nationalism. Harry Gamboa Jr. became editor in 1971 and Gronk, Herrón, and Valdez were recruited individually by Gamboa to create art for the journal. Initially the magazine was published as Carta Editorial under activist Francisca Flores. The name change to Regeneración in 1970 pays homage to the radical newspaper of the same name published in Los Angeles by the Partido Liberal Mexicano (PLM) led by Ricardo Flores Magon during the Mexican Revolution in the 1900s. The name change marks a shift of editorial emphasis and format provoked by the advent of a new political era while both referencing and embodying historical continuity of Chicano activism in Los Angeles .

Regeneración was one of the many publications produced during the Chicano movement. Each publication had its own regional focus and political agenda. Regeneración functioned as a venue for both early Chicana feminist thought and for the artwork of the Asco, who had recently graduated from high school. It is characteristic of the print culture of the Chicano movement through its convergence of commentary, news, photojournalism, poetry, and visual art. As opposed to the conventional medium of Social Realism, Asco instead contextualized aspects of the avant-garde into their own circumstances. The images they produced expressed the absurdity and violence of their experience in East Los Angeles in the early 1970s. The magazine's studio space was provided by Herron, who used his mother's garage as an art studio.

Regeneración's first volume featured artwork directly corresponding with the political and cultural orientation of other Chicano publications and also adopted a lengthier magazine format.

==== Gamboa's involvement with Regeneración ====
Gamboa joined Regeneración in the midst of the riot of August 29, 1970, in East L.A. at the Chicano Moratorium. He encountered Francisca Flores, where she handed him her copy of Regeneración and agreed to allow Gamboa to edit the next issue. This event proved decisive in creating a sense of urgency within the Chicano movement and was highly influential in the work of Asco. Gamboa's drawings appearing in the subsequent issue drew on pre-Conquest imagery while coinciding with the iconography associated with the radical press and the Chicano movement. The following volume included contributions from Willie F. Herrón III and Patssi Valdez. Their contributions allowed artwork to gain a more prominent role in the magazine.

Their artwork conveys the group's (and mainly Gamboa's) anger, frustration, and despair at the events and aftermath of the Chicano Moratorium. Their frustrations were aimed namely towards corruption in the police force and towards the death of journalist Ruben Salazar by the L.A. County Sheriffs, which perpetuated violence towards the Chicano population.

==== Herrón, Valdez's and Gronk's contributions ====
In contrast to the specificity of Gamboa's contributions, Herrón's contributions focus on the broader conditions of life in the barrio, namely the environment of violence and poverty and the suffering it imposes. His work is characterized by a level of abstraction which produces imagery that is frequently dark, pessimistic, and grotesque. His influences extend from die Neue Sachlichkeit and German Expressionism to Surrealism.

Valdez contributed a number of drawings to the first issues and by the final issue of Regeneración she expanded her work to combine ink drawing with collage, performance, photography, and texts. Many of her mixed media collages and photographs address the representation of femininity and self in terms of performativity.

Gronk's drawings were described as "broodingly implicit with dream-sexual connotations."

=== Performance art and No Movies ===
During the 1970s Gamboa, Gronk, Herrón, and Valdez collaborated on numerous projects which addressed contemporary popular culture and specifically the media.

==== Stations of the Cross and Walking Mural ====
Stations of the Cross, a reference to Christ's carrying of the cross to his crucifixion, was one of Asco's earliest collaborations. Performed on Christmas Eve in 1971, Stations of the Cross functioned as a Vietnam war protest and poked fun at Catholic traditions. The members of Asco dressed in costumes and carried a huge cardboard cross down Whittier Boulevard in East Los Angeles, and subsequently a crowd of holiday shoppers gathered. Asco led them to the local U.S. Marine recruiting station, then used the cross to blockade the entrance. The performance was meant to mock the Chicano mural movement by utilizing stereotypical religious iconography prevalent in Chicano Muralism. The group performed Walking Mural the following year on Christmas Eve. The members of the group appropriated stereotypical Chicano iconography into their dress, with Valdez parodying the ubiquitous Virgen de Guadalupe. This piece put Asco into a dangerous situation due to the potential for violent community reaction. Regarding this fact, Gamboa reflected that, "Either the police were going to take care of you or someone in the neighborhood was going to take care of you. So you met a lot of resistance because it was so conservative. And to even to stray into the sensitive area of religious icons or even hinting that you might not believe in certain things or might even question what America is all about, again, you were setting yourself up to be someone that's punished".

==== Spray Paint LACMA ====
Asco, Spray Paint LACMA, 1972. Colour photograph. Photograph: Harry Gamboa Jr, showing Patssi Valdez.

Spray Paint LACMA is Asco's most reproduced and cited No Movie. The artists created the work in reaction to racial prejudices against Chicanos perpetuated by a curator at the Los Angeles County Museum of Art in 1972. Gamboa asked a staff member, sometimes reportedly a curator, why there wasn't Chicano art in the museum. The response was that Chicanos "didn't make 'fine art'; they only make 'folk art,' or were in gangs". In response, the three male artists (Gamboa, Gronk, Herrón) in Asco spray-painted their names onto the entrance bridges and walls of the museum. Their use of graffiti alludes to the stereotype of the Chicano as a gang member who vandalizes public spaces, as mentioned by the LACMA staff member. It also creates the largest readymade work of art: by signing their names Asco recalls the artistic nomination used by Duchamp. Asco appropriates the technique of graffiti as an assertive means of resistance. Spray Paint LACMA was documented in color photographs by Gamboa, who had returned later with Valdez (Valdez did not participate in tagging the museum; she waited in the car). Their names were whitewashed within a few hours by museum staff.

=== Instant mural ===
This piece was created by, “Gronk, who had previously established himself alongside Herrón as a noteworthy muralist, performed as auteur in Instant Mural (1974), taping Valdez and frequent collaborator Humberto Sandoval to a wall.” In an article written by Emily Colucci, she writes, “Forcing the general public to confront the Chicano body, Asco again deftly merged art and politics.” With this statement it further supports the purpose of the mural, which is being able to identify and accept the varieties of how the Chicano body is presented. Williams Magazine further adds, “Instant Mural is a metaphor for thinking about how people can be confined in conditions of oppression or discrimination, poverty and other social—and psychological—issues.”

=== No-Movies ===
No-Movies addresses the exclusion of Chicanos within both mainstream Hollywood and the avant-garde cinemas of Los Angeles. With the taunting view of the Hollywood sign seen from the barrios of East Los Angeles, the members of Asco were constantly reminded that they were unwelcome in creative media and other culturally segregated artistic spaces. No-Movies consisted of conceptual performance art which usually involved elaborate scenarios and utilizing the landscape of Los Angeles as a set. No-Movies were commonly conceptualized and planned in advance by Harry Gamboa Jr. and “Gronk”. The scenarios were recorded on 35 mm slides, with one chosen for projection as the official record. The final film still functioned as a poster, summarizing and advertising a movie that was non-existent. No-Movies occupy a liminal space between the mural movement and the Super-8 films. Asco utilized the limited material resources available to them to allegorize their political situation. The creative format, described by Chon Noriega, was said to be an “intermedia synesthesia”, which acknowledged Asco’s use of inexpensive photographic equipment in place of more expensive materials. Asco wished to destabilize the power of the media’s oversaturated, exaggerated perceptions of life in the barrio with this project. This project aimed to expose the unsettling fascination popular media had for showcasing racial behavioral stereotypes. No-Movies allowed Asco to express their disdain and critique all while utilizing techniques of eccentric cinematic discourse. Conversely, this artistic installation displayed both their rejection of Hollywood as well as their desires of inclusion and control. The stills were later disseminated throughout the community through their use in presentations in schools, colleges, and public libraries, and eventually into the art world and media.

Additionally the group invented the Asco Awards, also known as the Aztlán or No-Movies Awards, in order to parody similar ceremonies held by Hollywood.

==== List of No-Movies ====
- Tumor Hats: 1973: Gronk, Herrón, and Valdez held a parody of a fashion show by posing in an empty theater while wearing hats made with junk materials.
- First Supper (After a Major Riot)/Instant Mural: 1974: Asco set a dinner table decorated with paintings of tortured corpses, a large nude doll, and mirrors on a traffic island on Whittier Boulevard, where three years earlier the police opened fire with shotguns on an assembled crowd. Asco prepared a celebratory feast of fruit and drink on the table. They designed the feast in order to encourage people to express themselves publicly, so as to contest the paramilitary police occupation of the barrio. At the end of the supper Asco performed Instant Mural. Gronk taped Patssi Valdez and Humberto Sandoval to a wall by a bus stop. The pair ignored passersby who offered to help untangle them. After an hour, Valdez and Sandoval walked away from the scene as if nothing had happened. Gronk felt that, "... the idea of oppression was that tape ... It had a conceptual message--a thought-provoking one: how we are bound to our community and get bound to our environment. How we get caught up in the red tape".
- Cruel Profit (1974): Herrón ritualistically destroys a doll in a still orchestrated by Gamboa, which was later translated to video.
- Á La Mode (1976): After ordering apple pie and coffee at Philippe's Original Sandwich Shop in Los Angeles, Asco members struck poses invoking classic movie stills while simultaneously expressing disdain towards the more fashionable patrons of the restaurant.
- Search and No Seizure, La Dolce, Waiting For Tickets: 1978: These three No Movies chronicle a melodramatic love affair between Valdez and Guillermo Estrada (a.k.a. Billy Star). Search and No Seizure was a performance piece in which the lovers posed in a passionate embrace in a tunnel under Bunker Hill. The piece was interrupted by harassment from the police. The next segment of the series, entitled La Dolce, parodies Federico Fellini's La Dolce Vita. La Dolce was performed at the Music Center, where cultural forms including the Opera and Symphony Orchestra of the city intersect with the downtown financial establishment. Waiting for Tickets concludes the series with the lovers embracing and rolling down the Music Center's steps. The scene functions as a mock "Odessa Steps" sequence, which Asco considered satire. Waiting for Tickets ridicules the city's cultural elite by expressing despair over the impossibility of being admitted to these institutions. The title refers to Samuel Beckett's Waiting for Godot.

== Exhibitions ==
- "Chicanismo en el Arte," Los Angeles County Museum of Art, California.
- "Asco: Elite of the Obscure, a Retrospective, 1972-1987", Los Angeles County Museum of Art, California.
- "Xican-a.o.x. Body", Pérez Art Museum Miami, Florida
