= Estrada Courts =

Housing project

Coordinates: 34.018973°N 118.208188°W

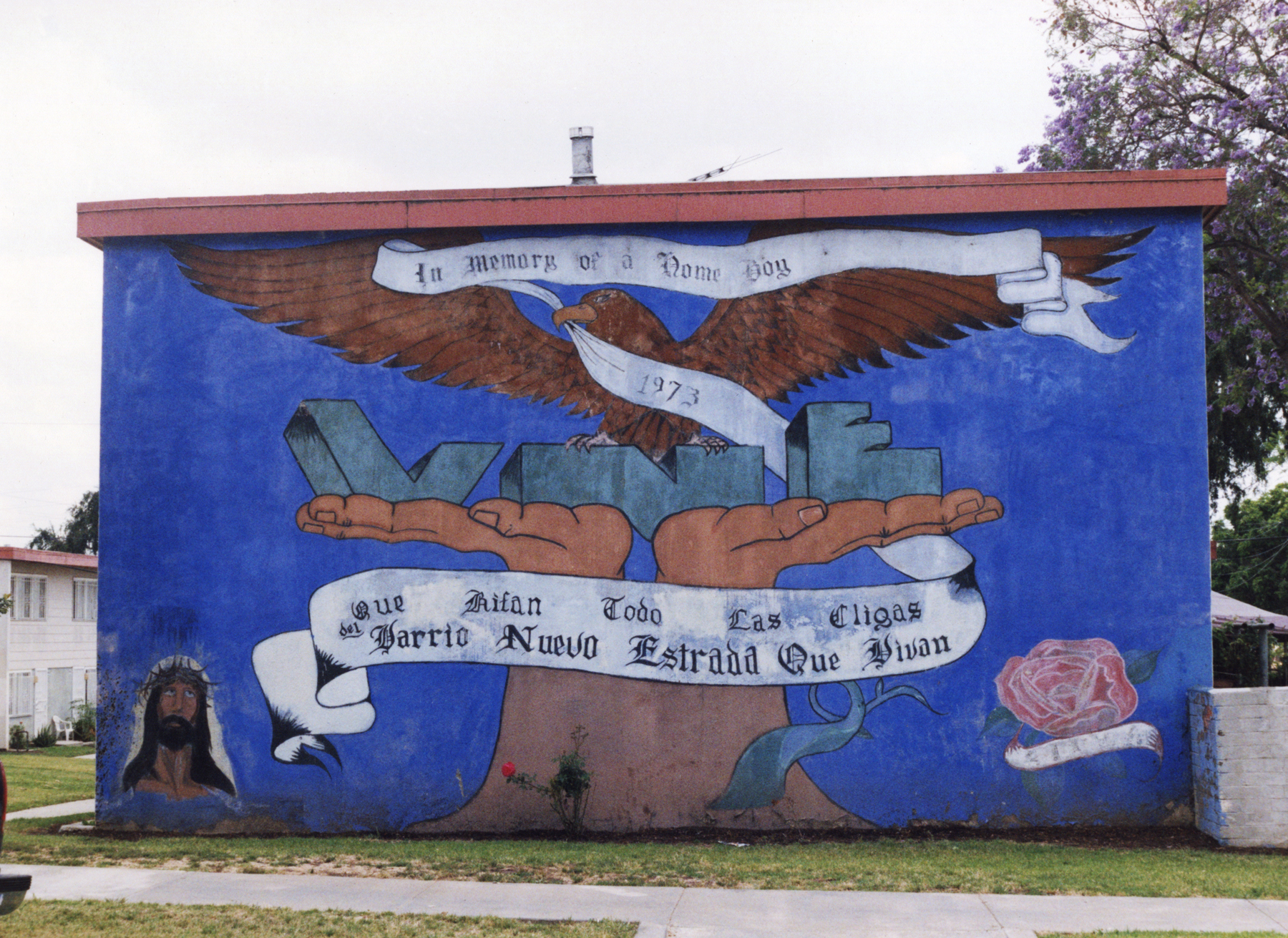
Mural at one of the main entrances to Estrada Courts.

Estrada Courts is a low-income housing project in the Boyle Heights area of Los Angeles, California. It is located on E. Olympic Blvd & S. Lorena St.

== History and construction ==
Estrada Courts was constructed in 1942–1943, during the World War II housing shortage in Southern California, which resulted from the war-time boom in war-industry work, followed by the return of servicemen to the region and the Bracero program. Of the original 30 buildings, 214 units were reserved for defense housing.

In 1954, Paul Robinson Hunter designed an extension of the site with Fred Barlow, Jr. providing 414 total apartments today. When the Estrada Courts were built it was unique to other housing projects because it “was not fully segregated or bound by racial restrictions”. The Estrada Courts allowed for more integrated complexes therefore, welcoming more than just the low-income/working class. Post-war era the Estrada Courts began to evolve, in the 1970s a total of eighty murals were painted by Chicano muralists.

Estrada Courts is owned by the City of Los Angeles and operated by the Housing Authority of the City of Los Angeles.

== Murals ==
Estrada Courts is well known for its murals, which reflect the barrio culture and traditions of the area.

“Chicano murals look the way they do, because the authors concentrate not only on individual murals but on mural clusters and establish a dialogic interplay of form, content, and location among them". The iconography in the mural clusters emerges from the sociohistorical context not only of the space where they are painted but also of the aesthetic norms of specific barrio cultures over an extended period of time.”

The murals include:

- Dream World by Norma Montoya (1974)
- Innocence by Norma Montoya (1975)
- Fishes of the Future by Norma Montoya (1976)
- Mural of Children by Charles Felix
- Two Flags by Sonny Ramirez (1973), located at 1364-6 Grande Vista Ave at Olympic
- In Memory of a Home Boy by Daniel Martinez (1973), located at 3328 Hunter Street
- Dreams of Flight by David Botello (1973-78, repainted in 1996), located at 3441 Olympic Boulevard
- The Sun Bathers by Gil Hernandez (1973), located at 3287 Olympic Boulevard
- The Artist by Daniel Haro (1973)
- Moratorium - The Black and White Mural by Willie Herron and Gronk (1973).
- La Fiesta by Roberto Chavez with students from East Los Angeles College, located at 3370-3372 1/2 Hunter Street, Los Angeles, CA 90023. (1973)
- We Are Not a Minority by El Congreso de Artistas Cosmicos de las Americas de San Diego (Mario Torero, Rocky, El Lion, Zade) (1978, repainted in 1996). The mural reads on the upper left corner: “In memoriam to the Guerrillero Heroico, el Doctor Che. Día del Rebelde Internacional XI aniversario Oct. 8th, 1978.” This mural can be seen in the music videos for "To Live & Die in L.A." by Tupac Shakur and "Where Is the Love?" by The Black Eyed Peas.

== Education ==
Residents are assigned to the following schools in the Los Angeles Unified School District:

- Dena Elementary School
- Stevenson Middle School
- Theodore Roosevelt High School
