= Metoyer =

Metoyer is a surname. Notable people with the surname include:

- Angelbert Metoyer (born 1977), American artist
- Cheryl Metoyer-Duran, Cherokee researcher and professor
- Herb Metoyer (1935–2015), American singer-songwriter and novelist
- Marie Thérèse Metoyer (1742–1816), American planter
