= Glenna Avila =

American artist and arts administrator

- Education: University of California, Los Angeles; University of New Mexico

Glenna Boltuch Avila is an American artist. Avila's work has been exhibited at the Laguna Art Museum and she and her work has been featured in the Los Angeles Times, and on KPCC. Her work is held in the collection of the University of California, Santa Barbara.

== Early life and education ==
In 1953, Avila was born in Los Angeles to a musician. Interested in contemporary art, Avila attended the University of California, Los Angeles (UCLA) in 1971. During her time at UCLA, Avila and a friend started a program to bring artists to the school to speak about conceptual art. Avila graduated with a Bachelor of Arts degree in Fine and Studio arts in 1975. She continued her education as a graduate student at the University of New Mexico from 1975 to 1976, earning a M.A. degree in Art. One of Avila's friends was painting a mural in an elementary school in Albuquerque, New Mexico which caught the attention of Avila since it involved children and the community. Avila brought that idea back to Los Angeles and became the art instructor for the Citywide Murals Program with Judy Baca in which she oversaw 250 murals, including those created by John Valadez and Carlos Almaraz. She later became the Wallis Annenberg Director of Youth Programs for the Community Arts Partnership program at CalArts, creating murals in Los Angeles county elementary schools while incorporating children and the community.

== Work ==
=== L.A. Freeway Kids ===
One of Los Angeles' most iconic murals and most notable artwork of Glenna Avila's is the L.A. Freeway Kids completed in 1984. Located on the Hollywood 101 South freeway, the L.A. Freeway Kids mural is one of the ten murals commissioned to celebrate the 1984 Olympics held in Los Angeles as well as youth, athletics and cultural diversity. According to Avila, she envisioned the mural to hold a significant meaning about diversity and childhood, while incorporating youth athletics since children were not part of the Olympics. She wanted to show the kind of potential kids can have in athletics. The mural is 250 feet long and 25 feet tall, consisting of seven children between 18 and 22 feet tall. Each child comes from a different racial background including Hispanic, Asian, Caucasian, and African-American, which communicates the diversity of Los Angeles. The mural is located near the Children's Museum, which is now closed, is a perfect view for drivers on the freeway to glance at along with children visiting the museum everyday which fits very nicely with the mural's theme.

Avila's L.A. Freeway Kids speaks to children, athleticism, cultural diversity, and community. There are seven children including four boys, one who is named Gabriel the basketball child, and three girls named Jennifer, Yuriko, and Misty, who are all shown as physically active. Since Avila wanted to incorporate children and their participation in athletics, the mural inspires everyone to be physically active, even if they are not part of the Olympics, and gives the message that everybody has the opportunity to participate in athletics whether you are an elder or a young child. The mural represents everybody, not just Los Angeles, but different cultural backgrounds from around the world. Isabel Rojas-Williams, who is an executive director of Mural Conservancy of Los Angeles, said that, “everyone who drives by is represented in the mural. The mural represents the rich diversity of Los Angeles.” The mural does incorporate a variety of racial identity in which it allows everyone to identify with it. The colors used in the mural ranges from warm to cool since it gives a colorful and positive feel of the children. The community of Los Angeles is also represented in the mural which can be seen on most of the children's shirts including the L.A. Zoo, Disney, the Children's Museum, and UCLA. Avila states her belief about community on museums by saying, “I believe that the museum today has a responsibility to involve its community and make its museum a place that welcomes community, reflects community and supports community.” Avila believes that community is an important aspect in art as it brings people from different backgrounds whether black, white, brown, or Asian together. The L.A. Freeway Kids represent the diversity and community within Southern California in hopes to inspire and incorporate everyone in the community to be who they are and pursue involvement together.

L.A. Freeway Kids was restored in 2012 by Los Angeles based artist and muralist Willie Herrón. Herrón, the Mural Conservancy of Los Angeles' head restorer, stated "We thought we could bring murals back to their original glory to create a drive-by gallery," when speaking of the Los Angeles Freeway Olympic Murals.
