= Nonetheless =

Studio album by Pet Shop Boys
- Released: 26 April 2024
- Recorded: 2023
- Length: 43:53
- Labels: x2; Parlophone
- Producer: James Ford

Pet Shop Boys chronology
Smash: The Singles 1985–2020 (2023)	Nonetheless (2024)	Furthermore (2024)

Singles from Nonetheless
- 1. "Loneliness" Released: 31 January 2024; 2. "Dancing Star" Released: 3 April 2024; 3. "A New Bohemia" Released: 4 June 2024; 4. "Feel" Released: 20 August 2024; 5. "New London Boy" / "All the Young Dudes" Released: 7 November 2024

Nonetheless is the fifteenth studio album by English synth-pop duo Pet Shop Boys, released on 26 April 2024 through the band's own label x2 and Parlophone. It was produced by James Ford and mostly recorded at his East London studio. The band's first album for Parlophone since Elysium in 2012, its four-year gap with Hotspot (2020) marks their longest period between studio albums to date. It was preceded by the single "Loneliness", released alongside the album announcement.

== Background ==
Nonetheless was composed during the COVID-19 lockdowns, when Chris Lowe and Neil Tennant were isolated at their respective homes. At Lowe's suggestion, Tennant learned to program with GarageBand, and the duo sent songs back and forth to each other. They found it refreshing to write for pleasure rather than to meet a deadline; Lowe remarked that he didn't realise they were making an album until Tennant sent his proposed track listing. The album title makes reference to their circumstances: "Nonetheless! We've carried on and done this."

In a statement, Pet Shop Boys expressed that they wanted the album, both its dance tracks and ballads, "to be a celebration of the unique and diverse emotions that make us human", and called the 10 tracks "the strongest indicators of where we are today". They also said that producer James Ford had "dared" them to make their "sometimes quite complicated" demos more minimal in arrangement. Ford replaced the soft-synths with analog synthesizers, and every track has an orchestra "filling out the sound and bringing out the emotions in songs," according to Tennant.

== Release ==
The album was released on 26 April 2024 in a variety of formats, including digitally, and physically on Blu-ray with Dolby Atmos, CD and multiple variants of coloured vinyl. The 2-CD and double white vinyl editions include a four-track EP titled Furthermore, featuring new recordings of "Heart", "Being Boring", "Always on My Mind" and "It's a Sin".

On 22 November 2024, they released an expanded edition of Nonetheless with bonus tracks and demo versions of all the album tracks.

=== Artwork ===
The album cover photo (pictured), taken by Tim Walker, shows Lowe and Tennant, dressed in vintage black suits and white gloves, with light coming from their mouths. To achieve the effect, they held bicycle lights in their mouths. Tennant called the image simple and iconic, and suggested that it might say something about their music. The idea of using the lights came from Walker; Pet Shop Boys had proposed a basic concept of a formal portrait with blindfolds, and these were also taken during the photo session. A photo of the duo wearing red blindfolds, with their white-gloved hands in front of their faces, was used for the single "Loneliness".

=== Singles ===
"Loneliness" debuted on 31 January 2024 as a preview of the album. It was the last song written for Nonetheless, inspired by the lockdown. Tennant described it as "an up sounding song with a lyric that starts off sad, but it turns around at the end." Alasdair McLellan directed the video, following a closeted young man leading a double life in 1992 Sheffield. Bonus tracks: "Party in the Blitz" and "Through You (extended mix)".

"Dancing Star" was released on 3 April in the lead-up to the album's release. It tells the story of preeminent dancer Rudolf Nureyev, who defected from the Soviet Union in the 1960s and became a star with The Royal Ballet. The video, directed by Luke Halls Studio, includes historic footage of Nureyev dancing. The track has sounds of waves and seagulls from Lowe's original demo about the beach. Bonus tracks: "Sense of Time", "If Jesus Had a Sister", "Dancing Star" remixes by Solomun, and "Party in the Blitz" remix by Superchumbo.

"A New Bohemia", released on 4 June, expresses nostalgia for being part of a creative scene. Lowe's demo was titled "Avant Garde", and Tennant's lyrics were inspired in part by an exhibit about Les Petites Bon-Bons, a group of gay conceptual artists in the 1970s. The video was filmed in Margate with cameos from Tracey Emin and Russell Tovey, and it was directed by Andrew Haigh, who used the Pet Shop Boys' Christmas 1987 Top of the Pops performance of "Always on My Mind" in his film All of Us Strangers. Bonus tracks: "It's Not a Crime" and "I've Got Plans (Involving You)" (both written in 1982); "A New Bohemia" demo and remix by Alex Metric.

"Feel" came out on 20 August, with a video directed by Corbin Shaw and Rawtape featuring actors Sam Bottomley and Tareq Al-Jeddal. The song had been offered to Brandon Flowers for his 2010 debut album; the reworked version on Nonetheless is about visiting a loved one in prison, inspired by a biography on George Blake. Bonus tracks: "Everybody Will Dance", with a Superchumbo remix; a Floorplan remix of "Loneliness"; and a German version of "Schlager-Hitparade" sung by Lowe, accompanied by a self-made video.

"New London Boy" was released on 7 November as a double A-side with a cover version of "All the Young Dudes" by David Bowie. A separate remixes single was also issued. In keeping with the theme of "New London Boy", the cover photos are of Tennant and Lowe around the time they came to London, in 1972 and 1981 respectively. Slava Mogutin directed a video of "All the Young Dudes". The remix artists are Boy Harsher, Richard X, and I. Jordan. Additional bonus tracks: "Beauty Has Laid Siege to the City" and "Clean Air Hybrid Electric Bus".

A supplementary single of "All the Young Dudes" in a medley with "West End Girls", recorded with the Manchester Camerata, was released on 11 November, including an orchestral remix by Stuart Price. The medley had been performed with the Camerata at the 2024 MTV Europe Music Awards on 10 November.

== Reception ==
=== Commercial performance ===
Nonetheless debuted at number two on the UK Albums Chart, selling 22,419 units its first week. It is the Pet Shop Boys highest-charting album since the compilation album Alternative reached number two in 1995. In the U.S., Nonetheless was the first Pet Shop Boys studio album to fail to chart on the Billboard 200, although it reached number 14 on the Top Album Sales chart and number three on the Dance/Electronic Albums chart.

=== Critical reception ===
Professional ratings
Aggregate scores
Source	Rating
AnyDecentMusic?	7.9/10
Metacritic	81/100
Review scores
Source	Rating
Clash	8/10
The Independent	4/5 stars
The Line of Best Fit	8/10
Mojo	4/5 stars
MusicOMH	4/5 stars
NME	4/5 stars

Nonetheless received a score of 81 out of 100 on review aggregator Metacritic based on ten critics' reviews, which the website categorised as "universal acclaim". Victoria Segal of Mojo wrote that the album "shows the duo pulling themselves up to full songwriting height, not just forging on, but flourishing". Mat Smith of Clash called Nonetheless "an utterly brilliant, dependably polished listen" and one of "the best moments" by the duo. Reviewing the album for NME, Gary Ryan described it as "peppered with richly-drawn characters, and esoteric cultural references" and a "lush, impressive collection that upholds their status as pop greats".

The Independent's Helen Brown felt that the album "maintains the band's strict quality control without any notable change in sonic style" but "proves that the Pets have still got the brains, still got the hooks". John Murphy of MusicOMH said that it "both sounds very like Pet Shop Boys while also managing to grow and evolve their sound" and observed "a huge streak of melancholy and reflection running through the record". Simon Heavisides of The Line of Best Fit concluded that Nonetheless "feels airy and welcoming" unlike the Pet Shop Boys' recent albums and "resonates emotionally in ways that befit elder statesmen who can look to the future while comfortably acknowledging the past".

==== Year-end lists ====
Select year-end rankings for Nonetheless
Publication/critic	Accolade	Rank	Ref.
Albumism	50 Best Albums of 2024	21	
Classic Pop	Best of 2024	8	
The Guardian	50 Best Albums of 2024	21	
MOJO	The Best Albums Of 2024	32	

== Track listing ==
All tracks are written by Chris Lowe and Neil Tennant.

Nonetheless – Standard edition track listing
No.	Title	Length
1.	"Loneliness"	5:38
2.	"Feel"	5:02
3.	"Why Am I Dancing?"	3:32
4.	"New London Boy"	4:52
5.	"Dancing Star"	3:01
6.	"A New Bohemia"	4:00
7.	"The Schlager Hit Parade"	3:28
8.	"The Secret of Happiness"	5:25
9.	"Bullet for Narcissus"	3:50
10.	"Love Is the Law"	5:02
Total length:		43:56

Disc 2: Furthermore (CD deluxe edition)
No.	Title	Writer(s)	Length
1.	"Heart" (New Version)		3:57
2.	"Being Boring" (New Version)		5:52
3.	"Always on My Mind" (New Version)	Wayne Carson; Mark James; Johnny Christopher	4:20
4.	"It's a Sin" (New Version)		4:37
Total length:			18:47

Disc 2: Furthermore (CD deluxe edition Japanese Edition)
No.	Title	Length
5.	"Clean Air Hybrid Electric Bus"	3:03
Total length:		21:50

Disc 2: Bonus & Demos (Nonetheless Expanded Edition)
No.	Title	Writer(s)	Length
1.	"All the Young Dudes"	David Bowie	3:17
2.	"Adrenaline"		3:41
3.	"The Dark End of the Street"	Dan Penn; Chips Moman	4:39
4.	"Miserere"	Gregorio Allegri	2:18
5.	"Loneliness" (Demo Version)		4:50
6.	"Feel" (Demo Version)		4:53
7.	"Why Am I Dancing?" (Demo Version)		3:30
8.	"New London Boy" (Demo Version)		5:08
9.	"Dancing Star" (Demo Version)		2:56
10.	"A New Bohemia" (Demo Version)		4:25
11.	"The Schlager Hit Parade" (Demo Version)		3:28
12.	"The Secret of Happiness" (Demo Version)		5:02
13.	"Bullet for Narcissus" (Demo Version)		3:50
14.	"Love Is the Law" (Demo Version)		4:12
Total length:			56:11

== Personnel ==
Credits adapted from the liner notes of Nonetheless and Nonetheless Expanded Edition.

Pet Shop Boys

Vocals, programming, keyboards, guitar

- Chris Lowe
- Neil Tennant

Additional vocals

- Abimbola Amoako-Gyampah
- Senab Adekunle
- Nile Bailey
- Dawn Joseph (expanded edition tracks 1, 3)

Orchestra

Elysian Collective

- Emma Smith – violin
- Flora Curzon – violin
- Freya Goldmark – violin
- Ronald Long – violin
- Anna de Bruin – violin
- Kotono Sato – violin
- Jennymay Logan – violin
- Lucy Wilkins – violin
- Hazel Correa – violin
- Ros Stephen – violin
- Patrick Dawkins – violin
- Preetha Narayanan – violin (tracks 1–5, 7–9)
- Simmy Singh – violin (tracks 6, 10)
- Morgan Goff – viola
- Alison De Souza – viola
- Zami Jalil – viola
- Amy May – viola
- Laura Moody – cello
- Sergio Serra – cello
- Daisy Vatalaro – cello
- Val Welbanks – cello
- Serafina Steer – harp
- Adam Chatterton – flugelhorn, trumpet
- Graeme Flowers – flugelhorn, trumpet
- David Hopkin – flugelhorn, trumpet
- Richard Ashton – French horn
- Carys Evans – French horn
- Joseph Ryan – French horn
- Jon Stokes – trombone
- Chris Augustine – trombone
- Samuel Freeman – bass trombone
- Barnaby Slade – tuba

Technical

- James Ford – production, mixing, engineering (all tracks); orchestral arrangement; brass arrangement; additional programming, keyboards, guitars, percussion, drums, flute
- Matt Colton – mastering (Nonetheless)
- Andy Baldwin - mastering (Furthermore)
- Pete Gleadall – additional engineering (Nonetheless); mixing (Furthermore)
- Jeremy Murphy – orchestral engineering
- Luke Pickering – orchestral engineering
- Animesh Raval - orchestral engineering (expanded edition tracks 1, 3)
- Ryan Jacob – brass arrangement, brass fixing, brass conductor
- Richard Jones – orchestral arrangement, strings conductor, piano (expanded edition track 4)
- Anne Dudley - orchestral arrangement and conducting (expanded edition tracks 1, 3)
- Laura Moody – strings fixing
- Jas Shaw – additional mixing

Artwork

- Tim Walker Studio – photography
- Kate Phelan – stylist
- Terry Barber – make-up
- Farrow/PSB – design

== Charts ==
Chart performance for Nonetheless
Chart (2024)	Peak position
Australian Albums (ARIA)	3
Austrian Albums (Ö3 Austria)	3
Belgian Albums (Ultratop Flanders)	10
Belgian Albums (Ultratop Wallonia)	4
Croatian International Albums (HDU)	3
Dutch Albums (Album Top 100)	16
Danish Albums (Hitlisten)	35
Finnish Albums (Suomen virallinen lista)	20
French Albums (SNEP)	24
German Albums (Offizielle Top 100)	3
Hungarian Albums (MAHASZ)	8
Irish Albums (Official Charts)	13
Italian Albums (FIMI)	49
Japanese Albums (Oricon)	27
Japanese Digital Albums (Oricon)	30
Japanese Hot Albums (Billboard Japan)	30
Polish Albums (ZPAV)	57
Portuguese Albums (AFP)	22
Scottish Albums (Official Charts)	1
Spanish Albums (Promusicae)	7
Swedish Albums (Sverigetopplistan)	39
Swiss Albums (Schweizer Hitparade)	2
UK Albums (Official Charts)	2
US Top Album Sales (Billboard)	14
US Top Dance Albums (Billboard)	3
