= Dancing Star (song) =

Single by Pet Shop Boys

from the album Nonetheless
- B-side: "Sense of Time"; "If Jesus Had a Sister"
- Released: 3 April 2024
- Recorded: 2023
- Genre: Synth-pop
- Length: 3:01
- Label: x2
- Songwriters: Neil Tennant; Chris Lowe
- Producer: James Ford

Pet Shop Boys singles chronology
"Loneliness" (2024)	"Dancing Star" (2024)	"A New Bohemia" (2024)

Music video
- "Dancing Star" on YouTube

"Dancing Star" (stylised in sentence case) is a song by English synth-pop duo Pet Shop Boys from their fifteenth studio album, Nonetheless (2024). It was released on 3 April 2024 as the album's second single.

== Background and composition ==
The song was written by Neil Tennant and Chris Lowe. It tells the story of preeminent dancer Rudolf Nureyev, who defected from the Soviet Union in the 1960s and became a star with The Royal Ballet. The lyrics open with the mention of the Amalfi Coast where Nureyev had bought the Gallo Lungo island and spent the final years of his life. The song also alludes to the dancer's bisexuality.

The track has sounds of waves and seagulls from Lowe's original demo about the beach.

== Release ==
"Dancing Star" was released digitally on 3 April 2024 as the second single preceding the duo's album Nonetheless. The song entered the top 40 on the UK and German download charts. Following the single's CD release on 5 May 2024, the song reached number one on the UK singles sales chart.

== Critical reception ==
"Dancing Star" received positive feedback from music publications, with critics describing it as "sublime", "euphoric", and one of the standouts on Nonetheless. John Murphy of MusicOMH described it as "a banger – instantly catchy and with a melody that nods to Madonna's "Holiday"." Other reviewers also noted similarities to the duo's 1988 hit "Domino Dancing".

== Music video ==
The music video was directed by Luke Halls Studio and includes historic footage of Nureyev dancing.

== Track listings ==
- Digital download / streaming
1. "Dancing Star" (Solomun Extended Remix) – 5:20
2. "Dancing Star" (Solomun Dub) – 5:05
- Digital EP / CD single
1. "Dancing Star" – 3:01
2. "Sense of Time" – 4:09
3. "If Jesus Had a Sister" – 4:11
4. "Dancing Star" (Solomun Extended Remix) – 5:20
5. "Party in the Blitz" (Superchumbo Remix) – 4:36
6. "Dancing Star" (Solomun Remix) – 3:32

== Charts ==
Weekly chart performance for "Dancing Star"
Chart (2024)	Peak position
German Singles Downloads (GfK Entertainment)	39
UK Singles Downloads (OCC)	34
UK Singles Sales (Official Charts Company)	1
UK Physical Singles (Official Charts Company)	1
