= Grace Perreiah =

American artist (1936–2026)

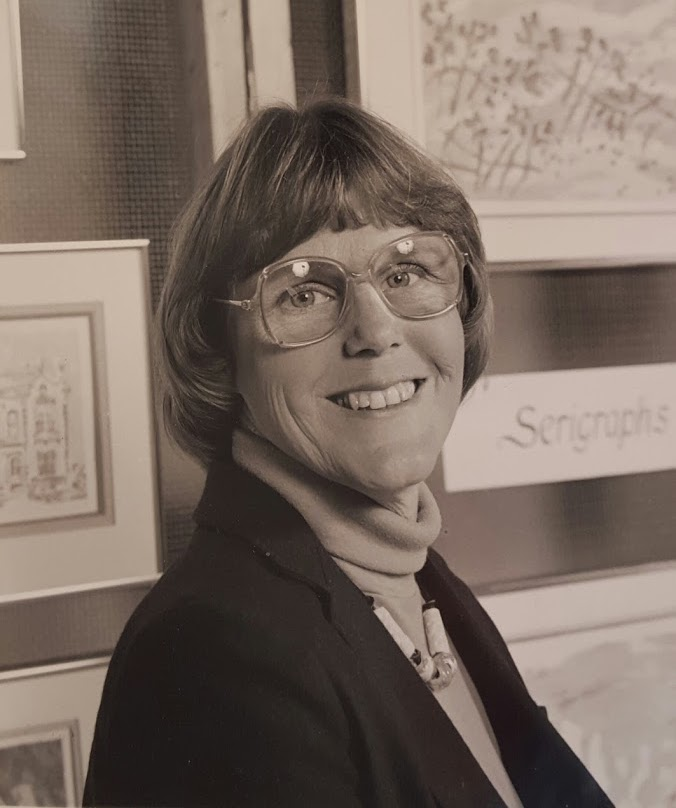
- Born: Eleanor Grace Sievert; September 8, 1936; Los Angeles, California, U.S.
- Died: August 28, 2026 (aged 89); Lexington, Kentucky, U.S.
- Education: Immaculate Heart College; Indiana University Bloomington
- Known for: Serigraphy

Eleanor Grace Perreiah (September 8, 1936 – August 28, 2026) was an American artist from Lexington, Kentucky known for her serigraph prints depicting historic buildings in Kentucky, and other subjects.

== Early life and education ==
Perreiah was born in Los Angeles, California on September 8, 1936. She received a BA in art from Immaculate Heart College in Los Angeles, where she studied under Corita Kent. She attended graduate school at Indiana University Bloomington and studied at the International Arts Studio in Florence, Italy. Later, she studied the history of architecture, historic preservation, and interior design at the University of Kentucky.

== Career ==
In 1967, Perreiah moved to Lexington, Kentucky, and became a founding member of the Kentucky Guild of Artists and Craftsmen. Working with fine press printers in central Kentucky including Robert James Foose at Buttonwood Press, and Arthur Graham at Polyglot Press, she produced hand-printed serigraphs that illustrate limited-edition works such as her Eight Fables of Aesop (Buttonwood Press, 1969) and Elegant Homes of Lexington (Polyglot Press, 1982).

Perreiah was a member of the Lexington Art League from 1967 and exhibited her work in library, gallery, and museum venues across the region.

Among her notable commissions, Perreiah created several hundred serigraph prints for display in hospital rooms in Kentucky, developed in consultation with a psychologist to select colors and forms with therapeutic qualities.

== Artistic style ==
Perreiah's serigraphs were produced by hand, using a layered printing process on stretched silk with oil-based inks, which produced variation between individual impressions of the same print.

== Death ==
Perreiah died on August 28, 2026, at the age of 89.

== Collections ==
- University of Kentucky Libraries, Lexington, Kentucky, United States
- New York Public Library, New York, New York, United States
- Library of Congress, Washington, DC, United States

== Works and publications ==
- Perreiah, Grace (1969). Eight Fables of Aesop. Buttonwood Press. OCLC 57471. "edition of 40 copies, illustrated by Grace Perreiah with eight original serigraphs"
- Perreiah, Grace (1976). The Song of Songs Which Is Solomon's: Chapter II. Polyglot Press. OCLC 2685106. "edition of 70 copies, printed by hand in Forum type on Arches paper by Arthur Graham, typographer, and six serigraphs by Eleanor Grace Perreiah, illustrator"
- Perreiah, Grace (1982). Elegant Homes of Lexington, Kentucky, 1897: Six Serigraphs. Polyglot Press. OCLC 9273824. "edition of 60 copies, rendering six houses illustrated in an 1897 article in The Commercial Tribune of Cincinnati with accompanying excerpts from the article and notes by Walter E. Langsam"
- Perreiah, Grace (1984). Historic Main Street: A View of Lexington's Vanishing Past. OCLC 15546306. "five pages, one folded leaf of illustrations"
- Perreiah, Grace (1984). Fine Homes of Louisville, 1888: Seven Serigraphs. OCLC 36836156. "edition of 35 copies, including the text of a January 7, 1888 Harper's Weekly article entitled 'Louisville, Kentucky' by Kirk Monroe and seven serigraphs designed and printed by hand by Grace Perreiah (colophon info)"
