= Queer Chicano art =

Art in Los Angeles by queer artists

The queer Chicano art scene emerged in Los Angeles, California during the late 1960s and continued into the early 1990s. Featuring the work of queer Mexican-American artists, the scene was influenced by the gay liberation, Chicano civil rights, and women's liberation movements. The scene's activity and art highlight themes of political activism, social justice, and identity. In particular, the scene's expressive work conveys the social and political conditions impacting Chicano communities as well as queer people, including the HIV/AIDS epidemic.

== Queer Chicano art and community ==
The queer Chicano scene in Los Angeles represents a convergence of the Chicano art movement and activism for socio-political issues during the 1960s and 1970s. According to Robert Lyle Hernandez, the Chicano art movement sought to create an artistic identity for Mexican-Americans, but centered on a heteronormative and gendered way of being. In Hernandez's interpretation, the queer Chicano art scene provided a representation of sexual difference that was missing from the Chicano art movement at the time. Queer Chicano art dealt with issues of sexuality, gender, ethnicity and belonging, and the impacts of the AIDS epidemic.

Although the community's efforts are not well known, the community had a hand in shaping Chicano LGBTQ+ history.

== Influences ==
=== Chicano movement ===
The experiences of the Chicano civil rights movement greatly influenced the queer Chicano art scene. The Chicano Movement (El Movimiento) which spanned from the 1940s to 1970s was a social and political movement organized by Mexican Americans to fight for civil rights and against structural racism, while providing a voice for the community.

The queer Chicano community in Los Angeles can be viewed as an extension of this solidarity, and represents a cultural arm of the civil rights struggle. Queer artists in the Chicano Movement drew from their lived experiences in order to create a political identity and a mean for self-expression.

=== Gay liberation ===
The queer Chicano community drew inspiration from the gay liberation movement in its creation and expression of art. The gay liberation movement began in the late 1960s as a movement to end social and political discrimination against LGBTQ+ people. Despite the existence of the Chicano Movement, it was evident to queer Chicanos that there was no space for them in the political discourse of the time. Accordingly, queer Chicanos utilized ideologies and tactics from the gay liberation movement to establish their place within the Chicano community and gain a voice in political discussions.

After the Stonewall riots in 1969, there was a shift in visibility for queer identity. Unlike the earlier homophile movement, the gay liberation movement highlighted the need for visibility through "coming out" as queer and refusing to assimilate to social norms. Artists were emboldened by the ideology of gay liberation to create art representing their sexual identity and denounce heteronormativity. Within the gay Liberation movement, the queer art scene functioned to create representation and a voice for queer identity.

=== Women's rights ===
The queer Chicano scene drew influences from the strides being made within women's rights during the 1960s and 1970s. The Women's Liberation movement fought for political, social, and economic equality between genders. Chicanas were inspired both by efforts to challenge gender inequality and by their identities as queer Mexican Americans.

While the feminist movement was making strides for change, many feminist spaces still excluded black and brown people. Both the Feminist Movement and feminist art often centered whiteness and white bodies within their art. As a result, the queer Chicana movement advocated for inclusivity that simultaneously challenged ideas of patriarchy, racism, and gender. Queer Chicana artists within the movement challenged gender stereotypes emulated throughout the Latinx community and the Chicano movement. Female artists with Mexican heritage created art in contrast to gendered, patriarchal, and white-dominated art of the 1970s United States. Notable queer Mexican American artists working within this community include Patssi Valdez, Judith Baca, and Laura Aguilar.

While the Chicano culture had strong ties with machismo, many queer women in the art movement were criticized both for their Chicana identity and for their efforts to uphold feminist ideals. For example, Patssi Valdez's Instant Mural of 1974 received backlash from feminists at the time. As Instant Mural portrayed Valdez confined to a wall with duct tape, feminists expressed outrage at Valdez for allowing herself to be tied up. Valdez has indicated that while her original vision for the piece reflected personal childhood trauma, she later attributed feminism to her art as well. She felt Instant Mural was a metaphor for confinement and conditions of discrimination and oppression such as poverty, social, and psychological issues.

== Key artists ==
=== Edmundo "Mundo" Meza ===
Edmundo "Mundo" Meza, also known as Mundo Meza, was a Mexican-American artist, known as a central figure in the scene, and an activist for the queer Chicano community in Los Angeles. Meza was born in Tijuana, Mexico, but was raised in East Los Angeles. Meza worked in a variety of media including abstract paintings, sketches, performances, and window displays, but is most widely regarded as a painter. His work addressed social issues through Mesoamerican imagery and illustrations of gay liberation. Meza's work aimed to expand awareness and understanding of queer Mexican American identity. His work drew from experiences and shared stories to express identity and fight the stigma of stereotypes surrounding the LGBTQIA+ and Mexican-American community. He often collaborated with other Chicano artists, especially Robert Legorreta (Cyclona).

On February 11, 1985, Meza died of complications of AIDS at the age of 29. Even after his death, his work continued to create community, belonging, and identity for queer Mexican Americans.

A popular work by Meza, Merman with Mandolin (1984) illustrates a mythical, idealized version of Meza as a merman, portraying beauty and confidence. Created after Meza was diagnosed with AIDS, this portrait alludes to pride and self-confidence.

=== Patssi Valdez ===
Patssi Valdez was born in 1951 in East Los Angeles in a Hispanic urban culture. Valdez used her art to challenge expectations for Chicana femininity by utilizing overt gender performativity. She documented gender representation using multimedia art, including photography, painting, and performance. Through her art, she was able to negotiate and exploit gendered ideologies.

A popular work by Valdez is hand-painted photograph of Sylvia Delgado. The Portrait of Sylvia Delgado (1980) renders Delgado as a heavily made-up force of nature, challenging the way femininity was being portrayed in art.

=== Laura Aguilar ===
Laura Aguilar was born on October 26, 1959, in San Gabriel, California. She was the daughter of a first-generation Mexican-American father and a mother of mixed Irish and Mexican descent.

Aguilar was a photographer associated with Los Angeles' queer Chicano art scene. Her photography centered on the identities of large-bodied working-class Chicana women, who were often considered background subjects at the time. Through her chronicling of the human body and Chicana identity, she raised awareness of mental health topics and equity in art.

Aguilar's Lesbian Latina examined the diversity of experience in being queer and Chicana. Lesbian Latina featured portraits of women, including herself, accompanied by handwritten reflections of each woman's sexual identity.
