= Jerry Dreva =

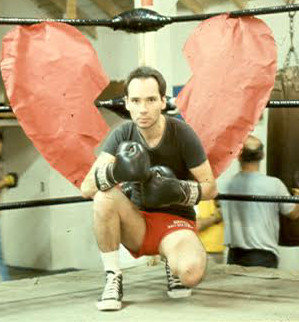
- Dreva 1981

Jerry Dreva (1945–1997) was an artist, writer, performer, activist, and teacher from South Milwaukee, Wisconsin. He was a principal proponent of Mail art. His efforts were concentrated in the areas of self-documentation and performance, often employing subterfuge and a wry sense of humor. He was a founding member (with Robert J. Lambert) of the conceptual rock band Les Petites Bon-Bons.

== Early work and activism ==
Active in the local civil rights and anti-war movements in the late 1960s, Dreva was devoted to the cause of gay rights on the local and national level. He was a founding member (together with Robert J. Lambert) of Les Petites Bon-Bons, a flamboyantly attired musical group that never played a single concert. In fact, they never so much as picked up an instrument. Instead they dressed as glitter rock musicians of the era (1970’s) and were frequently featured in newspapers and magazines as Les Petite Bon Bons.

In one of his most famous performances he would sneak out at night and spray paint public buildings in South Milwaukee. The next morning, in his role as a reporter for the local South Milwaukee weekly, the Voice-Journal, he would report glowingly on these graffiti events sometimes signed by the “Art Gangster” thus creating a countercultural figure and simultaneously influencing the way in which that figure was portrayed in the media. It was a ruse that lasted several years.

As a mail artist he corresponded with individuals well known for their work in this field including On Kawara, Ray Johnson, Ben Vautier, Coum Transmissions, General Idea and members of Asco. His work was included in countless mail art exhibits both nationally and internationally, including Extended Sensibilities: Homosexual Presence in Contemporary Art at the New Museum in New York in 1982.

During the 1980s Dreva became increasingly interested in Latin America, learning Spanish and spending considerable time in Guatemala, El Salvador and other Central and South American countries, where he studied revolutionary movements. He was a supporter of the Shining Path in Peru, but adamant in insisting that gay rights be included in their agenda.

== Legacy ==
Dreva died of a heart attack at his Milwaukee home in 1997 at the age of fifty-two. His work has attracted the attention of a growing number of writers and curators and has been featured in catalogs and exhibitions from the Museum of Contemporary Art, Los Angeles (MOCA) and the Los Angeles County Museum of Art (LACMA).
