= Karen Boccalero =

American nun and artist (1933–1997)

- Born: Carmen Rose Boccalero; May 19, 1933; Globe, Arizona, US
- Died: June 24, 1997 (aged 64); East Los Angeles, California, US
- Education: Immaculate Heart College; Temple University

Karen Boccalero (May 19, 1933 – June 24, 1997) was an American nun, fine artist, and founder and former director of Self-Help Graphics & Art.

== Early life and education ==
Carmen Rose Boccalero was born in Globe, Arizona, to Italian-born father, Albert Boccalero, and Italian-American mother, Annie Guadagnoli. She moved to Los Angeles, California, with her family as a child. Overlapping with World War II, she lived in El Paso, Texas, with extended family during her freshman year of high school before returning to Los Angeles to live with her mother and Jewish stepfather. She attended Immaculate Heart College in Los Feliz, California, where she studied with Sister Corita Kent. Boccalero pursued further art education at the Tyler School of Art abroad in Rome, Italy, and earned an MFA as a printmaker at Temple University.

== Career ==
Boccalero founded and named Self-Help Graphics in Boyle Heights in 1971, with a group of Chicano artists. She had acquired a printing press and started a workshop in a garage rented by her order, the Sisters of St. Francis of Penance and Christian Charity. Self-Help Graphics was both a print studio and a community center, with Sister Karen as its longtime director. She worked to highlight Mexican cultural elements in much of the studio's output, and in the educational programs that they undertook. She was instrumental in organizing the first Dia de los Muertos celebration in Los Angeles. "Sister Karen was very adamant about including Mesoamerican and Mexican iconography and history in teaching young people in East L. A.," noted instructor Linda Vallejo.

Boccalero was a persuasive fundraiser for the program. Her training as an artist informed her work supporting emerging artists. She considered the studio her mission, as a Franciscan nun, and her order recognized it as such, even while she was supporting Willie Herrón in bringing East Los Angeles punkero bands to perform regularly in the studio. In 1988, Boccalero won a Vesta Award from the Woman's Building, for her work in arts community support.

Boccalero lived to see Self-Help Graphics featured in a major exhibit at Laguna Art Museum in 1995.

== Personal life and legacy ==
Boccalero wore modest informal secular clothing, not a religious habit. "She dedicated herself as a bride of Christ, but she was also a progressive, chain-smoking, cussing nun," remembered colleague Tomas Benitez.

Karen Boccalero died in 1997, aged 64, of a heart attack. A traditional altar was erected in her memory, covered in artworks, photos, cigarette boxes, and marigolds. There was a tribute exhibit to Sister Karen on the tenth anniversary of her death, at Self Help Graphics & Art. Posters by Boccalero and other artists from her community were part of the American Sabor exhibit at Bob Bullock Museum in 2010. Work by Sister Karen was also featured in Now Dig This! Art and Black Los Angeles, 1960–1980, a 2011–2013 traveling show organized by the Hammer Museum in Los Angeles.

Galería Sin Fronteras in Austin, Texas began with inspiration from the work of Karen Boccalero. Self-Help Graphics & Art continues as a community institution in East Los Angeles.
