= Patricia Reif =

American philosopher and theologian (1930–2002)

Patricia (Pat) Reif, also known as Sister Richard, (May 6, 1930 – March 24, 2002), was an American professor of philosophy and theology, known locally and nationally for her involvement in ecumenical issues, for her innovative leadership in the field of feminist spirituality and for her leadership in the Women's Ordination Conference. She was a founding member and leader of the ecumenical Immaculate Heart of Mary Community established in 1970 in Los Angeles as a result of irreconcilable differences between Cardinal James F. McIntyre over the implementation of Vatican II reforms. Along with the 455 vowed members of the canonical order of the Immaculate Heart of Mary, Reif was a leader in the development of the new community's innovative philosophical foundations. Most notably, in 1984, as chair of the religious studies department at Immaculate Heart College Center, she founded the nation's first graduate program in Feminist Spirituality.

== Early life, education and early career ==
Reif was a lifelong resident of Los Angeles. She became a member of the order of the Immaculate Heart of Mary in 1946. She received her bachelor's degree from Immaculate Heart College in 1953. She taught at St. Bernardine High School in San Bernardino, California, and Immaculate Heart High School in Hollywood, CA. She earned her doctorate in philosophy from Saint Louis University in 1961. In the 1960s and 1970s, she was involved in the anti-nuclear movement.

== Career ==
Before earning her Ph.D. in philosophy with a dissertation entitled, "The Textbook Tradition in Natural Philosophy, 1600–1650" from St. Louis University in 1961, Reif taught at St. Bernardine High School in San Bernardino and Immaculate Heart High School in Hollywood. During the 1960s and 1970s, she taught philosophy and theology, bringing internationally renowned women theologians to Immaculate Heart College. These women scholars brought new, creative insights into thinking about church which added a new dimension to the life of her community and the college. She was the chair of the religious department at Immaculate Heart College in Los Angeles, and its successor institution Immaculate Heart College Center, until her retirement in 1993.

In the late 1960s and early 1970s, the sisters of the Immaculate Heart of Mary became embroiled in a controversy with Cardinal James F. McIntyre over Vatican II recommendations. Given her background in theology and philosophy, Reif (known as Sister Richard at the time), played an integral role in the discussions that reformed the order of the Immaculate Heart of Mary from a Catholic canonical institution into an ecumenical community that included lay women and men of different Christian traditions. Along with over 400 Immaculate Heart of Mary sisters, Reif renounced her canonical vows in the creation of the new Immaculate Heart of Mary Community. In fact, all of the innovations she promoted in her work on the philosophical underpinnings of this new community "including professionalizing standards, experimenting with community worship and giving sisters control of their daily activities" are standard practice for Catholics across the country today.

Reif's commitment to social justice and her belief in the necessity of combining academic study with social engagement for change led to her leadership in efforts to address hunger issues and worker rights in the Los Angeles area. She was the co-founder of multiple, ecumenical justice efforts in southern California including the Interfaith Hunger Coalition and the Southern California Ecumenical Council's Interfaith Taskforce on Central America in the 1970s. In these efforts, she also worked with Cesar Chavez and the organization Bread for the World, an ecumenical group working to support refugees fleeing poverty and war in Central America.

In the 1980s, her work turned to a focus on feminist spirituality which led her to promote renewal of the community and academic structures of the Immaculate Heart of Marry community based on feminist, theological principles. In 1984, as head of the religious studies department at the Immaculate Heart College Center, Reif founded the first Master's program in Feminist Spirituality in the United States., With her input, the academic community developed a structural model for the Immaculate Heart College Center based on cooperation instead of competition sharing leadership and decision making by consensus. Under this model Immaculate Heart College Center emphasized community engagement which "forced students out of the classroom into projects that "supported positive change within local communities". Mary E. Hunt, founder of Women's Alliance for Theology, Ethics and Ritual(WATER), states "It made a lasting impact on the field…." Even the professors who lectured in this first ever Master's program in Feminist Spirituality "learned a great deal from Pat… about adult education models and respectful co-learning".

As a philosopher, she influenced authors who wrote on various Aristotelian concepts, explaining materiality and form in sixteenth century thought. Reif was also an early leader in the Women's Ordination Conference which worked for the ordination of and the general rights of women in the Catholic Church. During the 1990s, Reif served as chair of the WOC board

== Death and legacy ==
Reif retired to Pilgrim Place in Claremont, California, in 1993 and died of pancreatic cancer in March 2002. The Pat Reif, IHM, Memorial Lecture was established by the Immaculate Heart Community in honor of her significance as a feminist scholar, professorial leader and her legacy as a social justice and human rights activist.
