= Immaculate Heart College =

Catholic college in Los Angeles, California (1906–1981)

- Type: Private
- Active: 1905–1981
- Accreditation: Western College Association
- Religious affiliation: Catholic
- Academic affiliations: Catholic University of America
- Location: 2021 N. Western Avenue, Los Angeles, California, 90028, United States

Immaculate Heart College (1905–1981) was a private Catholic college located in Los Angeles, California, United States. The college offered various courses including art and religious education studies.

== History ==
The Sisters of the Immaculate Heart of Mary founded, owned, and conducted the Immaculate Heart High School in 1905 in Los Angeles, California. It had six female graduates by June 1906. In the following decades, both Immaculate Heart High School and the College soon established their reputations as an excellent university preparatory schools for girls and co-educational centers respectively. By far the majority of the high school's more than 10,000 graduates continued their education at colleges and universities nationwide.

The college was affiliated with the Catholic University of America. It was accredited by the Western College Association.

In the late 1960s, in response to directives from Vatican II as well as participation in therapy experiments run by researchers from the Esalen Institute, the Sisters followed the guidance of Pope Paul VI and conducted an extensive review of their structure and proposed changes in how they prayed, worked, lived together and governed themselves. However, the Archbishop of Los Angeles, Cardinal James Francis McIntyre, was opposed to all of the sisters' proposed changes, leading to a public dispute where he ordered the removal of all Immaculate Heart Sisters teaching in Los Angeles diocesan schools, and finally presented the Community with an ultimatum: either conform to the standards of traditional religious life or seek dispensation from vows. In the end, 90% chose to dispense from their vows and reorganize as a nonprofit organization (501(c)(3)), The Immaculate Heart Community, a voluntary lay community. Patricia Reif played an important part in encouraging the establishment of an ecumenical community.

Corita Kent was a member of the community and obtained her degree from IHC; she taught art at the college between 1938 and 1968.

The college closed in 1981 due to financial difficulties; its successor was the Immaculate Heart College Center, which closed in 2000.

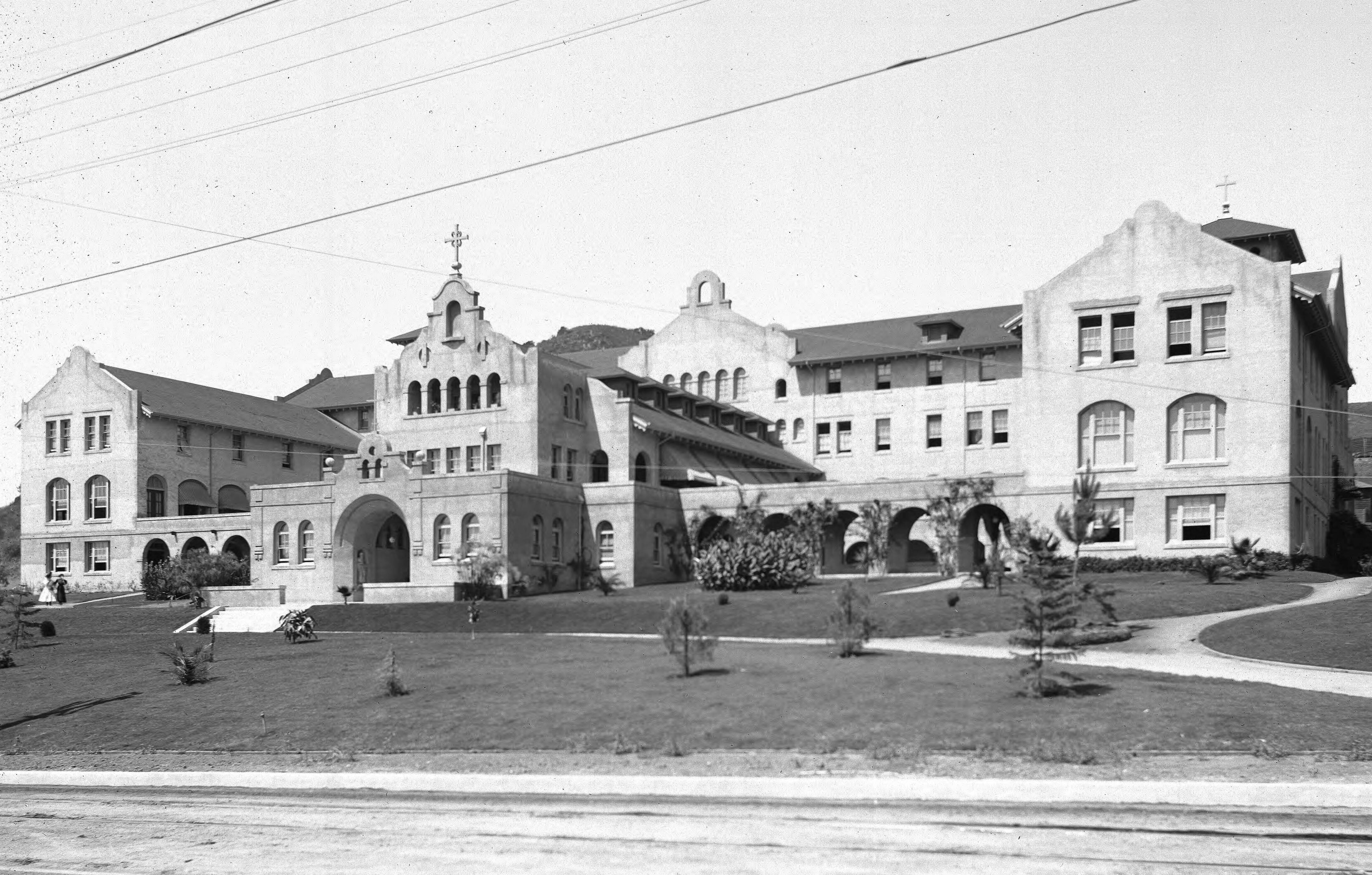
Front facade of Immaculate Heart College

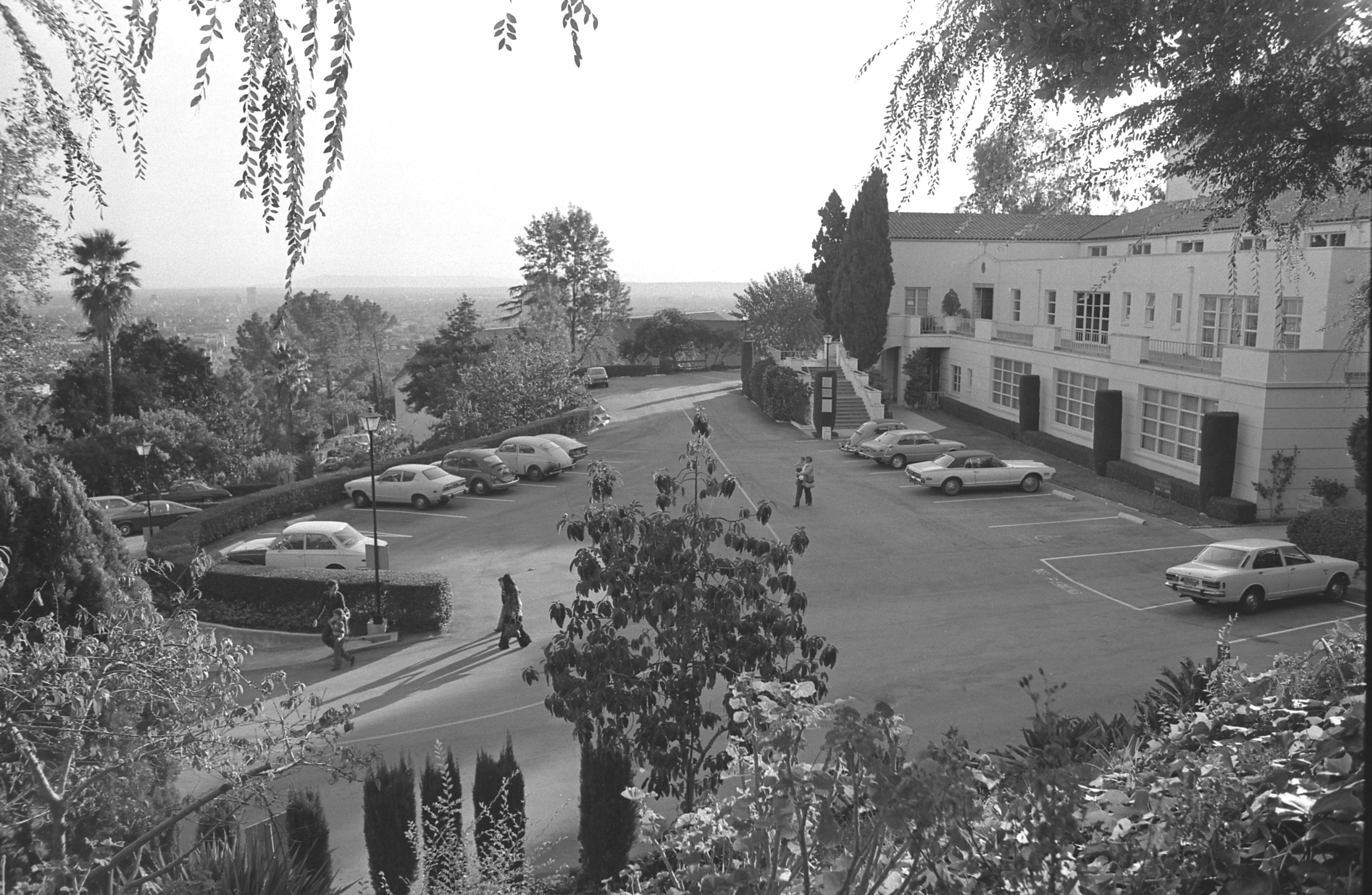
The exterior of the Immaculate Heart College Library in 1979

== Campus ==
Immaculate Heart College was located on a15-acre (61,000 m^{2}) property on Franklin Avenue at the head of Western Avenue in the Hollywood Hills of Los Angeles, California. It shared the property with the Immaculate Heart Convent and Immaculate Heart High School. Its main building was constructed in 1905 in Moorish and Mission architectural styles. It included classrooms, student boarding facilities, offices, and the living quarters of the sisters. This building was torn down in 1973 after being damaged in the 1971 Sylmar earthquake and was replaced with a new classroom building. Its Student Union Building, later called the Jo Anne Cotsen Building, was purchased by the American Film Institute in 1983. The campus also included a library.

== Academics ==
The college offered various courses including art and religious education studies. It granted Bachelors' degrees, Master's degrees, and teaching and library science credentials. The high school specialized in preparing its students for university education.

== Notable alumni ==
The female and male graduates of the college went on to become distinction as artists, musicians, educators, journalists, doctors, lawyers, judges, and stars of stage and screen. Some Immaculate Heart women were pioneers in professions not accustomed to having women.

- Karen Boccalero (1933–1997), nun, artist, founder of Self-Help Graphics & Art in Los Angeles
- Charlotte Caffey (born 1953), musician and songwriter, "The Go-Go's"
- Lucia Capacchione (1937–2022), art therapist
- Pat Carroll (1927–2022), voice actress and actress well known for the voice of Ursula in The Little Mermaid
- Demi (born 1942), author and illustrator
- Angie Dickinson (born 1931), actress, Police Woman
- Corita Kent (1918–1986), nun, artist, and professor
- Cheryl Metoyer-Duran, researcher and professor at the University of Washington known for her work on Indigenous knowledge
- Cherríe Moraga (born 1952), playwright and activist
- Grace Perreiah (born 1936), artist and printmaker
- Mark Ridley-Thomas (born 1954), California legislator
- Joey Terrill (born 1955), American visual artist
- Helena Maria Viramontes (born 1954), novelist and short story writer, professor of English at Cornell University
- Jennifer Warnes (born 1947), Grammy Award-winning singer, songwriter, producer
