= Gronk (artist) =

American painter (born 1954)

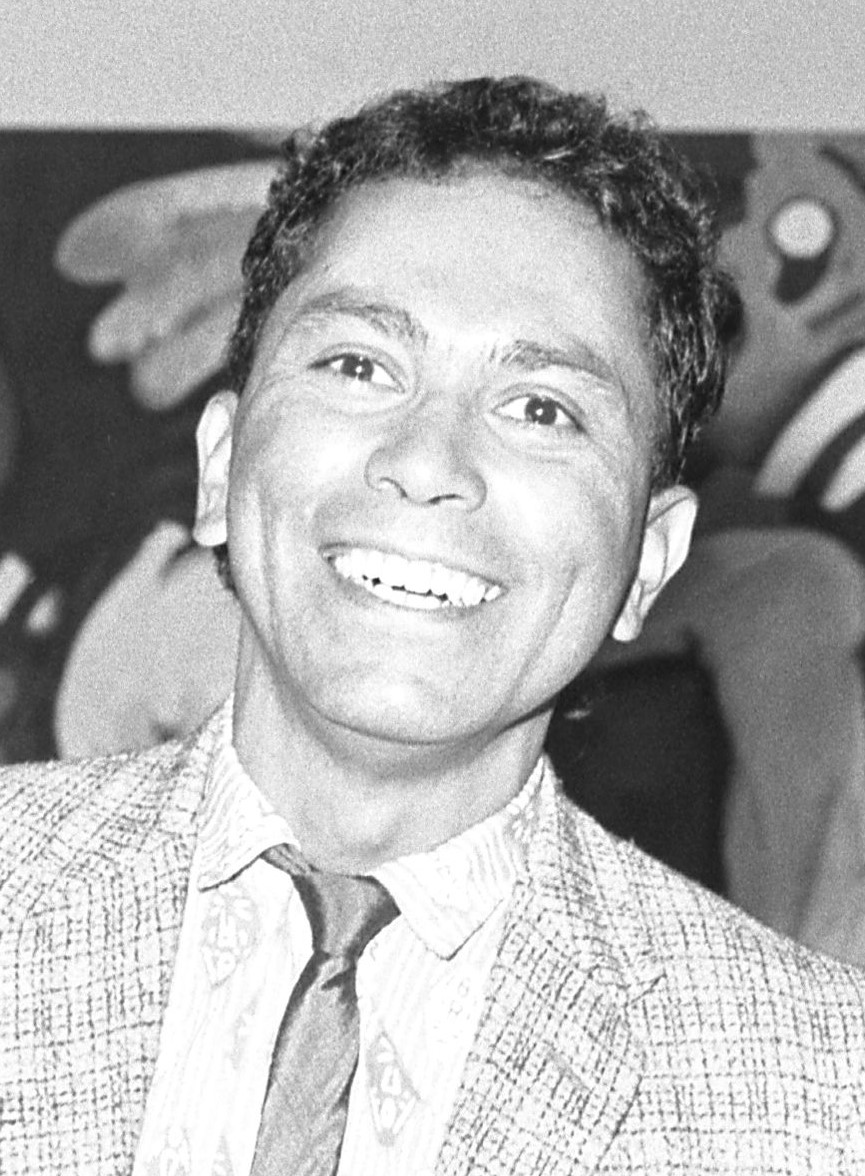
- Gronk in 1986
- Born: Glugio Gronk Nicandro; 1954 (age 71–72); Los Angeles, CA
- Education: East Los Angeles College, California State University of Los Angeles
- Known for: Murals, Performance, Photography, Painting, Drawing, Set Design
- Notable work: Puta's Cave, No Movies
- Movement: Chicano Art

Gronk (born 1954 in East Los Angeles, California, USA), born Glugio Nicandro, is a Chicano painter, printmaker, and performance artist. His work is collected by museums around the country including the Smithsonian American Art Museum.

== Biography ==
Gronk was born in Los Angeles to Mexican-American parents and was raised primarily by his mother. He started creating things at a young age. He cites pop culture as a source of inspiration. Another artistic influence on Gronk was his uncle, who would frequently draw.

Among other influences, foreign films which he generally watched in Santa Monica, are mentioned. He was fascinated with the larger world and concepts that many of these films from Russia, France and elsewhere brought to his imagination. At age fourteen, Gronk started writing his own plays.

One of his earliest performance plays was Cockroaches Have No Friends, which led to him meeting Patssi Valdez, Harry Gamboa Jr., Willie Herrón and Sylvia Delgado, with the first three of them becoming members of Asco later on. Gronk also worked with Mundo Meza and Cyclona on various performance pieces, especially those that pertained to gender issues. On December 18, 2024. Gronk was Hosting The LA Bowl at SoFi Stadium in Inglewood, California for the NCAA bowl games

Gronk took his education beyond what he learned in school. He was a big reader from a young age and liked to learn everything he could about a subject he was interested in. He did much of his research at the library, gaining a vast knowledge of European modern art and film. Gronk recalls that in high school that he did not fit into "the confines of compulsory heterosexuality." He states that he sat at the 'queer table' at lunch but because he was an excellent artist, students at the school didn't consider him to be gay. Bored with high school and stimulated into political action by the anti-Vietnam War and the Chicano Blowouts at East Los Angeles schools, Gronk and friends barely attended their final years in school, and may not have graduated. He took some classes at East L.A. College.

When Gronk performed Cockroaches Have No Friends at East L.A. College, it was a disaster, but afterwards, Gamboa contacted Gronk and invited him to work on a magazine project called Regeneracion with Valdez and Herron. Working on the magazine, they drew together in garages owned by Valdez' and Herron's mothers. This work on the magazine led to the creation of Asco.

During the Vietnam War, Gronk was drafted and went to boot camp at Fort Ord for a period of around two weeks. He was unable to conform, according to the army, and he was sent back home.

== Career and art ==
Gronk was a founding member of Asco, a multi-media arts collective based in Los Angeles which was active in the 1970s and 1980s. Influenced by European film, existentialism, and literature—especially the work of Albert Camus, Jean-Paul Sartre, and Samuel Beckett. Gronk as a member of Asco made "movies without film" and farcical "happenings" or street performances.

In 1977, Gronk was one of the founders of Los Angeles Contemporary Exhibitions (LACE). Gronk's involvement with LACE often involved his creation and execution of murals, many of which were considered controversial. Indeed, other artists criticized Asco and Gronk for being too nontraditional. Gronk often clashed with founder of East LA's Self Help Graphics, Sister Karen Boccalero, who he called "the smoking nun."

Gronk has not always sought to bring his art to just those who regularly visit galleries: he has circulated fliers about his work at "bus stops, seeking workers, students and the people of the streets." Gronk uses his "lowbrow" style to confront the viewer and ask them to rethink "visual paradigms," using humor and irony to make his statements. One of his most visible challenges to the status quo took place as a member of ASCO when he, and co-members Harry Gamboa and Willie Herrón, tagged their names on the Los Angeles County Museum of Art (LACMA) after being told that LACMA didn't collect Chicano art because it wasn't "fine art."

After 1984, Gronk began a series of paintings that included one of his recurring figures, La Tormenta who functions like a guide through his art. This body of work was considered more "acceptable" to the mainstream world of art.

He is best known for his murals, including those at Estrada Courts in East Los Angeles. More recently his murals have been intentionally painted as temporary art works (i.e., Fisher Gallery, University of Southern California) to be whitewashed later.

Gronk's murals, paintings on canvas, and widely collected screen prints, relate to the direct visual aesthetic contained in works by German Expressionist Max Beckmann and the cartoon-like paintings of American Philip Guston, along with vernacular arts of early civilizations (i.e., Toltec figurines). Gronk has collaborated with Tandem Press. His work is represented by Daniel Saxon of Saxon Gallery, West Hollywood, California. Gronk is accessible to students and others, often seen walking in Downtown Los Angeles. Comfortable with the moniker "Chicano artist", Gronk's intense devotion to craft and multi-disciplinary pursuits are informed by a wide knowledge from a myriad of global and historic sources.

Gronk has been involved with theater since his Asco days, and in 1995 he was commissioned to design sets for the Los Angeles Opera and Santa Fe Opera. His scenic work has also been featured onstage with Latino Theater Company and East West Players.

In 1996, Gronk won a Los Angeles Dramalogue Award for Set design of the Theatrical play of "La Chunga". He has collaborated with composer Joseph Julian Gonzalez on “Tormenta Cantada,” a visual/musical piece performed in 1995, and with Kronos Quartet at University of California, Los Angeles. In 2003, Gronk was in residency at University of New Mexico, as part of the Cultural Practice/Virtual Styles project. In 2011, he was Artist-in-Residence at Fullerton College. That same year, his work was exhibited in the retrospective ASCO: Elite of the Obscure at the Los Angeles County Museum of Art, the same venue that where Asco famously left its graffiti "tag" decades earlier in protest against the official Chicano art of "Los Four." He also curated "Altares", a small exhibition at UCLA's Hammer Museum.

In 2023 Gronk participated in the 7th SUR: Biennial at Cerritos College Art Gallery where he transformed the Cerritos College Art Gallery's Projects Space into his temporary studio while he worked on a new 32-foot long multi-panel painting commissioned by the Cerritos College Committee on Art in Public Spaces for the Fine Arts Building's west hallway. In 2024, his work as part of Asco was on view at the Pérez Art Museum Miami for Xican-a.o.x. Body a group exhibition spanning over fifty years of Chicano art, from the 1960s to the present.

Examples of Gronk's work can be found in Cheech Marin's collection of Chicano art housed at The Cheech Marin Center for Chicano Art & Culture. These include La Tormenta Returns (1998), described in a review of the first showing of Marin's collection as a "painting with unparalleled depth and complexity. His characteristic black and white compartments appear to have been invaded and reworked by multiple hands, resulting in a densely interwoven palimpsest whose imagery and style reflect diverse sources, from Brancusi sculptures to graffiti-inflected Neo-expressionist painters." The painting was created live during a 45 minute performance of a string quartet with a soprano (known as Tormenta), while Gronk worked an amplified paintbrush he treated as a conductor’s baton. According to the artist, the painting has dramatic, operatic, and filmic properties (the latter in overlaps that relate to dissolves). Pérdida (Lost), another notable painting in Marin's collection, takes its name from a 1950 Mexican melodramatic film. The densely packed forms (many of them sculptural) are stand-ins for people.

=== Collections ===
- Denver Art Museum, Denver, Colorado
- Museum of Contemporary Art, Los Angeles, California
- El Paso Museum of Art, El Paso, Texas
- Corcoran Gallery of Art, Washington, DC
- The Mexican Museum, San Francisco, California
- University of Texas, El Paso, Texas
- San Jose Museum of Art, San Jose, California
- Carnegie Art Museum, Oxnard, California
- National Hispanic Cultural Center, Albuquerque, New Mexico
- Los Angeles Country Museum of Art, Los Angeles, California
- Cerritos College, Norwalk, California

=== Set designs ===
2005 Ainadamar (The Fountain of Tears), Music by Osvaldo Golijov, Libretto by David Henry Hang, Directed by Peter Sellars. Santa Fe Opera, Sante Fe, New Mexico; traveled to Lincoln Center, New York, New York (2006)]

1998 L'Histoire du soldat (Story of a Soldier) by Igor Stravinsky, Directed by Peter Sellars. Los Angeles Philharmonic Music Center, Performing Arts Center of Los Angeles County, California. Traveled to Palmero, Italy; Paris, France;Madrid, Spain; Vienna, Austria (1998 - 2000)

1998 Los Biombos/The Screens by Gloria Alvarez, Directed by Peter Sellars, Cornerstone Theatre Company, Los Angeles, California

1997 Mexican Medea by Cherrie Moraga, Music by John Santos. York Theatre, San Francisco, California

1995 Welcome to the Moon by John Patrick Shanley, Directed by Kathy Scambiatterra. McCadden Theatre, Los Angeles, California

1995 Journey to Cordoba, Music by Lee Holdridge, libretto by Richard Sparks, Directed by Jose Luis Valenzuela. Los Angeles Opera, Music Center, Performing Arts Center of Los Angeles County, California

=== Murals and commissions ===
Murals and public commissions include the 2023 Cerritos College, Cerritos College Committee on Art in Public Spaces. Fine Arts Building, west hallway; and 1973 Moratorium - The Black and White Mural by Willie Herron and Gronk located at 3221 Olympic Boulevard, Los Angeles, California.

== Awards and nominations ==
- 2011 Artist in Residence, Fullerton College, California
- 2002 Artist in Residence, University of New Mexico, Albuquerque
- 1996 Artist in Residence, Villa Montalvo, Saratoga, California
- 1993 Artist in Residence, Tandem Press, University of Wisconsin, Madison
- 1993 Artist in Residence, Cornell University, Ithaca, New York
- 1983 Visual Artist Fellowship, National Endowment for the Arts
- 1977 Artists of the Year, Mexican-American Fine Art Association, Los Angeles, California

== Quotes ==
"I didn't go to galleries or museums. They weren't a part of my childhood. Yet all I had to do was walk outside my front door to see visual images all around me. Graffiti was everywhere and it helped me develop what I wanted to do."

"Ephemeral is also art."

"I'm an observer of my time, and I share my observations. That for me is the greatest job of an artist, the ability to share."

== See also ==
- Internal Exile
