= Harry Gamboa Jr. =

American photographer and essayist (born 1951)

- Born: 1951 (age 74–75); Los Angeles
- Known for: Performance art, Photography
- Movement: Chicano Movement
- Spouse: Barbara Carrasco
- Website: harrygamboajr.wordpress.com

Harry Gamboa Jr. (born 1951) is an American Chicano essayist, photographer, director, illustrator, and performance artist. He was a founding member of the influential Chicano performance art collective Asco.

== Life ==
Gamboa grew up in East Los Angeles, California, surrounded by the activism of the Chicano Movement and the political turmoil of Los Angeles in the 1960s, two factors which would have a major influence on his artistic practice. Gamboa attended Garfield High School, where he helped to organize a student walkout in 1968 as part of the "East L.A. Blowouts", part of a larger string of protests in which 15,000 students walked out of their classrooms demanding educational reform. Following his involvement, Gamboa was identified by the L.A. police as a 'militant' in a testimony before the U.S. Senate, an instance that would jeopardize his opportunity to achieve a higher education through the Education Opportunity Grant.

Despite these setbacks, Gamboa attended California State University, Los Angeles, where he expanded his interest in photography and art-making. During this time, he continued to express an interest in activism and in the Chicano Movement, leading to his recruitment by Francisca Flores in 1970 to be an editor of Regeneración, a magazine that gave new life to the Mexican newspaper of the same name that was created in the build up to the Mexican Revolution (1910-1920) by the Magón brothers. Through his involvement with Regeneración, he was able to reconnect with former classmates at Garfield High, Gronk (Glugio Nicandro), Patssi Valdez, and Willie Herrón, whom he recruited to contribute to the magazine. These artists, along with Gamboa, comprised the performance group Asco, which contributed to discourse over the Chincanx identity through their performance works.

As a part of the Asco collective, Gamboa was responsible for the documentation and the artistic direction of several of their performances. They would go on to make performance art together for fifteen years, from 1972 to 1987. Following the end of their collaboration, Gamboa has continued expanding upon his artistic practice, working independently. His recent works consist mainly of photography, video-projects, and performance.

== Work ==
His work has been exhibited by museums nationally and internationally. He has taught, lectured, and/or delivered artist talks and/or panel discussions at various universities and art institutions, including UCLA, University of California, San Diego, Otis College of Art and Design, Parsons School of Design, California State University, Northridge, and the California Institute of the Arts.

Harry Gamboa Jr.'s artistic practice has taken numerous forms, from his collaborative performances as a part of Asco, to his individual projects and following the group's separation in 1987, his roots in activism remain prominent. Among these works are Zero Visibility (1978) and his photographic series, Chicano Male Unbonded (1991), both of which focused on the experience of Chicano men.

=== Asco ===
The members of Asco (Spanish for "nausea") first began working collaboratively in December of 1972, conceptualizing the "walking mural" in their first performance, Stations of the Cross. In this work, three members of the group (Herrón, Gamboa, and Gronk) dressed in exaggerated costumes of pilgrims and dragged a cardboard cross down Whittier Boulevard, leaving it at the steps of the Marine Corps Recruitment Office. This work critiqued stereotypes of Mexican art by referencing the Mexican muralist tradition, as well as commenting on Mexican Catholic tradition.

Stations of the Cross was followed by one of their most famous performances, in which they signed their names using red spray paint on the Los Angeles County Museum of Art. This action was in response to the refusal of the curator to include works by Chicano artists in the museum collection, claiming that "Mexicans were not serious [artists]". In their work Spray Paint LACMA, Asco brought attention to Chicanx artists (themselves) and reclaimed the museum space using their signatures. Another well-known work by the group, First Supper (After a Major Riot), took place on December 24, 1974, in which they staged a banquet on a traffic medium of Whittier Boulevard. This work was in response to the LAPD's violent responses to protests or group assemblies on Whittier Boulevard, a major street that runs through Boyle Heights, a historical Chicano neighborhood.

In 2024, Asco's work was included in Xican-a.o.x. Body a comprehensive group exhibition on Chicano art narratives from the 1960s to the present day. The exhibition was on view at the Cheech Marin Center for Chicano Art & Culture at the Riverside Art Museum, California, and traveled to the Pérez Art Museum Miami, Florida. The exhibition accompanying publication was released by The Chicago University Press.

== Publications ==
- Urban Exile: Collected Writings of Harry Gamboa Jr. (1998) (ISBN 978-0816630523)
- Rider (2009) (ISBN 978-1448670307)
- Xoloitzcuintli Doppelganger and other stories (2018) (ISBN 978-1724629906)
- Striking Distance (2020) (ISBN 979-8669765798)
