= Cheryl Metoyer-Duran =

Native American researcher and professor at the University of Washington

Cheryl Metoyer
- Citizenship: Eastern Band of Cherokee Indians and U.S.
- Education: Immaculate Heart College (BA, MA); Indiana University (PhD)
- Occupation: Professor
- Awards: Rockefeller Fellowship in the Humanities (2006); Legacy Award (2018)

Cheryl Metoyer is an Eastern Band Cherokee researcher and professor of library and information science. Her research is focused on Indigenous systems of knowledge, especially in relation to American Indian and Alaskan tribal nations, as well as ethics and leadership in cultural communities. She holds the position of Associate Professor Emeritus and the Director of the Indigenous Information Research Group (IIRG) at the iSchool at the University of Washington.

== Education ==
Metoyer holds bachelor of arts and master of arts degrees from Immaculate Heart College. Metoyer received her doctoral degree in library and information science from Indiana University in 1976.

== Career ==
Metoyer has served on faculty at a number of universities in the United States. She is currently an Associate Professor Emeritus at the University of Washington. She was previously on faculty at the UCLA Graduate School of Library and Information Science. She was the Chief Academic Affairs Officer for the Mashantucket Pequot Tribal Nation. From 1993 to 1997, Dr. Metoyer held the Rupert Costo Chair in American Indian History at the University of California, Riverside.

Metoyer worked with numerous Indigenous groups to assist with the development of their libraries, archives and museums. She was Project Director at the National Indian Education Association where she worked with tribal and state agencies to plan and develop library services, including the Mashantucket Pequot, Cahuilla, San Manuel, Yakama, Navajo, Seneca, Mohawk and the Lakota nations

Metoyer has researched and developed Indigenous subject headings for use within library and information systems, including the Mashantucket Pequot Thesaurus Project where she acted as principal investigator. The thesaurus is intended to: "construct a user-centered thesaurus, designed to reflect the information-seeking behavior of scholars and researchers who study American Indian subjects." It can be applied in a number of settings, including a museum setting as is demonstrated in an article by Littletree and Metoyer.

Using Indigenous worldviews and perspectives Metoyer's developed a taxonomy of gatekeeper theory in ethnolinguistic communities as a way to consider systems of control and their application within structures such as information systems.

== Awards and honours ==
- The Joint Conference of Librarians of Color Legacy Award (2018)
- Rockefeller Fellowship in the Humanities (2006)

== Advisory roles ==
- Advisory Board, Newberry Library D’Arcy McNickle Center for American Indian History
- The Southwest Museum
- The National Commission on Libraries and Information Science
- The National Endowment for the Humanities
- The U.S. Department of the Interior
- The National Museum of the American Indian
- The University of Arizona, Knowledge River Program.
- UW House of Knowledge Planning Committee.

== Publications ==
- Metoyer-Duran, Cheryl; Hernon, Peter (1995). "Economic development on American Indian reservations: A citation analysis". Library and Information Science Research. 17 (1): 49–67. doi:10.1016/0740-8188(95)90005-5. ISSN 0740-8188.
- Metoyer-Duran, Cheryl (1993). Gatekeepers in ethnolinguistic communities. Norwood, N.J.: Ablex Pub. Corp. ISBN 9780893918910.
- Metoyer-Duran, Cheryl (1991). "Information-Seeking Behavior of Gatekeepers in Ethnolinguistic Communities: Overview of a Taxonomy". Library and Information Science Research. 13 (4): 319–46. ISSN 0740-8188.
- Metoyer, Cheryl. (1976). American Indian Library Services—State of the Art Report. (ED161573). National Indian Education Association.
- Metoyer-Duran, Cheryl (1976). Perceptions of the Mohawk elementary students of library services provided by the National Indian Education Association library project as conducted on the Akwesasne (St. Regis) Mohawk reservation (PhD thesis).
- Metoyer-Duran, Cheryl; Hernon, Peter (1994). "Problem Statements in Research Proposals and Published Research: A Case Study of Researchers' Viewpoints". Library and Information Science Research. 16 (2): 105–18. doi:10.1016/0740-8188(94)90003-5. ISSN 0740-8188.
- Metoyer-Duran, Cheryl (1992). "Tribal Community College Libraries: Perceptions of the College Presidents". Journal of Academic Librarianship. 17 (6): 364–69. ISSN 0099-1333.
- Chavez, Juan Carlos; Metoyer-Duran, Cheryl (2017). Native American telecommunication independence: one step above smoke signals (Thesis). hdl:1773/38644.
- Day, Sheryl A; Metoyer-Duran, Cheryl (2017). Talking story: the militarization of Guåhan and flows of information in Chamoru systems of knowledge (Thesis). hdl:1773/38643.
- Metoyer-Duran, Cheryl (2010). "Leadership in American Indian communities: winter lessons". American Indian Culture and Research Journal. 34 (4): 1–12. doi:10.17953/aicr.34.4.m78g416545510r18. ISSN 0161-6463.
- Chavez, Juan Carlos; Metoyer-Duran, Cheryl (2017). Native American telecommunication independence: one step above smoke signals (Thesis). hdl:1773/38644.
- Metoyer, Cheryl. In Our Camp: Relationality in Native American Knowledge Organization. Event occurs at 35:44.
- Littletree, Sandra; Metoyer, Cheryl (2015). "Knowledge organization from an Indigenous perspective: The Mashantucket Pequot Thesaurus of American Indian Terminology Project". Cataloging & Classification Quarterly. 53 (5–6): 640–657. doi:10.1080/01639374.2015.1010113. S2CID 56524564.
