= John Valadez =

American Latino filmmaker

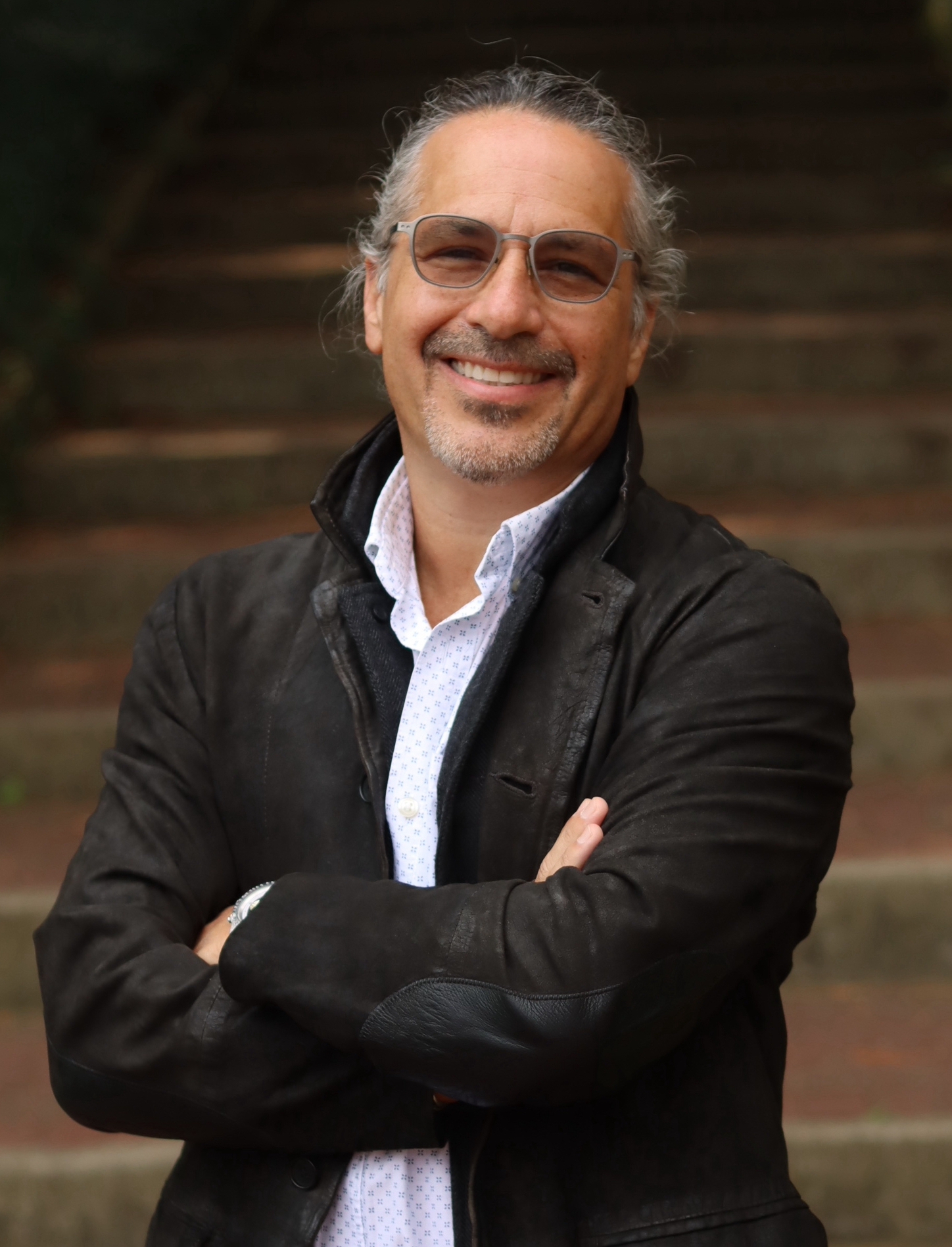
Valadez in 2021

John Joseph Valadez (born 1966) is an American Latino documentary filmmaker whose work focuses on the Chicano and Latino experience in the United States. His directed features have been nationally broadcast on PBS and CNN over the past 25 years. His series Latino Americans won a Peabody Award in 2013, and his work has received two national Emmy nominations.

== Biography ==
Valadez was born in Seattle, Washington.

He also taught photography in rural India. Valadez studied filmmaking at New York University's Tisch School of the Arts where he received a BFA. He received an MFA in filmmaking from the Vermont College of Fine Arts in Montpelier.

He served as Artist-in-residence at Texas State University, as Distinguished Filmmaker-in-Residence at The University of Texas, Arlington, and as a trustee of the Robert Flaherty Film Seminar.

Valadez previously taught at Michigan State University, and is currently a professor of documentary filmmaking at the University of Michigan, Ann Arbor.

== Filmography ==
His most recent film, American Exile, aired nationally on PBS in 2021. The film explores the deportation of US military veterans, and played a role in helping to change national policy, allowing deported veterans and their families to return home.

== Film ==
| Year | Title | Director | Producer | Notes |
|---|---|---|---|---|
| 1993 | Passin' It On | Yes | No | Valadez's first film. |
| 2008 | The Last Conquistador | Yes | Yes | Aired as a part of PBS's POV series. |
| 2010 | The Longoria Affair | Yes | Yes | Aired on PBS's Independent Lens series. |
| 2016 | The Head of Joaquin Murrieta | Yes | Yes | Short film aired on PBS. |
| 2021 | American Exile | Yes | Yes | Aired on PBS. |

== Television ==
| Year | Title | Director | Producer | Notes |
|---|---|---|---|---|
| 2003 | Matters of Race | No | Yes | Mini series on PBS |
| 2004 | Beyond Brown: Pursuing the Promise | No | Yes | |
| 2005 | CNN Presents | Yes | No | Episode High Stakes: The Battle to Save Our Schools |
| 2009 | Latin Music USA | Yes | Yes | Episode The Chicano Wave |
| 2013 | Latino Americans | No | Yes | Episodes War and Peace and Prejudice and Pride |

== Awards and nominations ==
| Year | Title | Award | Result |
|---|---|---|---|
| 1993 | Passin' It On | 1993 News and Documentary Emmy Awards- Best Editing | Nominated |
| 2005 | CNN Presents | IDA Award | Won |
| 2010 | Latin Music USA | IDA Award | Nominated |
| 2011 | The Longoria Affair | 2011 Outstanding Historical Programming- Long Form | Nominated |
| 2013 | Latino Americans | Peabody Award | Won |
