= Willie Herrón =

American Chicano muralist and artist (born 1951)

Willie F. Herrón III
- Born: 1951 (age 74–75); Los Angeles, California
- Education: Otis Art Institute; Art Center College of Design
- Known for: Muralism, Painting, Performance

Willie F. Herrón III (born 1951, Los Angeles, California) is an American Chicano muralist, performance artist and commercial artist. Herrón was also one of the founding members of ASCO, the East Los Angeles based Chicano artists collective (1972 to 1987).

== Early life and education ==
Herrón grew up in East Los Angeles and for years had been sketching the world around him. He studied at Otis Art Institute and Art Center College of Design.

== Work ==
Born in Los Angeles, Willie Herrón III's artistic career spans over forty years of performance and conceptual art, including music composition (member of Los Illegals and founder of ELA's Vex Club), as well as the design and execution of murals.

He completed six restorations of the historic 1984 Olympic Freeway Murals, Los Angeles 2012-2017, commissioned by the Mural Conservancy of Los Angeles. Herrón restored Kent Twitchell's "Lita Albuquerque Monument" and Glenna Avila's "L.A. Freeway Kids" in 2012 and Frank Romero's "Going to the Olympics" in 2013. Including the 1973 "Moratorium: the Black and White Mural" in Estrada Courts, Los Angeles 2016-2017.

He was a founding member of the punk band, Los Illegals. He co-owns a commercial design studio.

In 2024, Herrón's work as part of Asco was included in Xican-a.o.x. Body a major group exhibition at the Pérez Art Museum Miami, Florida, highlighting the works of Chicano artists from the 1960s to the present.

=== Asco ===
In the early 1970s Herrón was among the founding members of the Los Angeles art collective, Asco, which also included Patssi Valdez, Gronk, and Harry Gamboa Jr. Herrón and Valdez had been working on joint art projects since they were in high school together and for a time, Valdez and Herron dated. Herron was involved with Asco for about fifteen years.

=== Murals ===
Herrón's murals often incorporate the found imagery of existing graffiti into his own work. One of his most recognized murals, The Wall That Cracked Open was painted in about twelve hours and was an outpouring of his feelings about the violent attack his brother suffered from rival gang members. The imagery used in this mural is influenced by Pre-Columbian themes and invokes the concept of Atzlán. The fact that Herrón includes graffiti is a way of tying together the art of both the mural and of "Chicano graffiti" which he saw as both deserving "mutual respect."

== Exhibitions ==
Herrón's first major exhibition was with Gamboa and Gronk at the Mechicano Art Center in East Los Angeles in 1972. His art was also part of the Chicano Art: Resistance and Affirmation (CARA) exhibit that toured the United States.

Herrón’s artworks are seen in films, music performances and museums throughout the US and Europe. Recently in the exhibition "¡Murales Rebeldes!" at LA Plaza de Cultura y Artes, Los Angeles 2017 and The California Historical Society History Museum, San Francisco 2018, "LA Raza" and "Chicano Males Unbonded" at the Autry Museum of the American West, Los Angeles 2017 and the new Whitney Museum, New York 2015. Examples of his work were included in "Asco: Elite of the Obscure, A Retrospective,1972-1987” at the Los Angeles County Museum of Art (LACMA) in 2011, at Williams College Museum of Art in Massachusetts (2012), Berkeley Art Museum and Pacific Film Archive (BAM/PFA), the Museo Universitario de Arte Contemporáneo (MUAC), on the campus of the National Autonomous University of Mexico (UNAM) in Mexico City, and at the Smart Museum of Art, University of Chicago (2013).

=== Critical reception ===
Herron lends his assistance to struggling artists and those who struggle with their differences in traditional communities. He has been a "representative figure for the underappreciated Chicano and contemporary artist," especially after one of his well-loved murals was whitewashed.

== Artworks ==
- 1972 - "The Wall that Cracked Open" (mural)
- 1973 - "Moratorium: The Black and White Mural." In collaboration with Gronk and located at Boyle Height, Estrada Courts. 3221 Olympic Blvd., Los Angeles, CA 90023.
- 2011 - "Asco: East of No West"
- "Luchas del Mundo." Now destroyed, it was located on the north side of Hollywood Freeway at Alameda, California
