= Francisca Flores =

American activist (1913-1996)

Francisca Flores (December 1913, San Diego California - April 1996) was a labor rights activist, an early Chicana feminist, a journal editor, and an anti-poverty activist.

== Biography ==
Flores was born in 1913 in San Diego, California, to Maria Montelongo, a shop steward and cook, and Vicente Flores, a worker in a slaughterhouse. In 1926, one of her brothers died of tuberculosis; the same year, Flores contracted the same illness and spent the next 10 years in a sanatorium for those afflicted with the sickness. While there, Flores befriended female veterans of Mexican Revolution. These friendships led to her organize a political discussion group for women in the sanatorium, Hermanas de la Revolución Mexicana. Her experience with Hermanas de la Revolución inspired to her to promote women's rights and heavily influenced her ideas about politics, labor, and civil rights, which were leftist and decidedly pro-Mexican. Flores left the sanatorium in 1936 at age 23.

== Activism ==
In 1943 Flores joined the Sleepy Lagoon Defense Committee, a group of California activists committed to clearing a group of 12 young Mexican American men falsely convicted of murder in what came to be known as the Sleepy Lagoon Trial. Flores also organized underground viewings of the 1954 pro-union film Salt of the Earth, which was blacklisted during the McCarthy era. In 1960, she helped found the Mexican American Political Association (MAPA).

Flores felt that the Chicano Movement of the 1960s ad 70s did not adequately address Chicana women's rights and needs, so she and other women branched out from the movement and created the Comisión Femenil Mexicana Nacional, the first national Chicana feminist organization in the United States. She felt that it would improve the political and economic conditions of Mexican women in the United States. By the 1970s, the Comisión opened the Chicano Service Action Center (CSAC), a job trading center located in Los Angeles, two bilingual daycare centers (Centro de Niños), and a shelter for domestic violence victims. Eventually over 20 active chapters were established with approximately 300 members by the 1980s.

Today Flores is remembered as a Chicana feminist who sought to liberate Mexican American women. Flores came up against heavy criticism aimed at the Chicana feminist movement. Flores's response to the criticism that feminism was a, "betrayal of Chicano culture and heritage," was "Our culture hell!" which became a slogan for the Chicana feminist movement (2).

Flores was an editor of Regeneración, a feminist magazine modeled after the Mexican anarchist newspaper of the same name which had been published by the Magnón brothers in the early 1900s. In it she wrote, "Chicanas can no longer remain in a subservient role or as auxiliary forces in the Chicano movement. The must be included in the front line of communication, leadership and organizational responsibility.... The issue of equality freedom, and self-determination of the Chicana-like the right of self-determination, equality, and liberation of the Mexican Chicano community- is not negotiable" (1).

Flores was also a strong activist for women's rights when it came to making contraceptive more available and supporting women's reproductive rights. She wrote, "Abortion, in our opinion, is a personal decision. The women must be allowed to make it without legal restrictions," (4).
