= Pacific Standard Time: LA/LA =

Pacific Standard Time: LA/LA is an art event celebrating Latin American art in over 70 museums and galleries in Los Angeles and Southern California held from September 2017 through early 2018.

== See also ==
- Pacific Standard Time: Art in L.A., 1945–1980
