= Patssi Valdez =

American painter (born 1951)

- Born: 1951 (age 74–75); Los Angeles, California, U.S.
- Education: Otis College of Art and Design
- Known for: Painting, Performance Art, Fashion Design, Photography and Activism.
- Movement: Chicano Movement

Patssi Valdez (born 1951) is an American Chicana artist. She is a founding member of the art collective Asco. Valdez's work is a part of Chicana avant-garde expressionism, ranging from an assortment of mediums, such as painting, sculpture, and fashion design. She lives and works in Los Angeles, California.

== Early life and education ==
Valdez was born in 1951 and grew up in East Los Angeles. Valdez recalls that during the time she was growing up in Los Angeles, racism, police brutality and poor schools were a big problem. Valdez attended Garfield High School and graduated in 1970. She received a BFA degree in 1985 from Otis Art Institute (now Otis College of Art and Design).

== Career and work ==
Valdez was a founding member of the Asco artist collective. Valdez started working with Asco right out of high school. She was very involved with street performance art and "cinematic Goth film stills" during the 1970s and 1980s. Valdez relates that during her time in Asco, she had "grand ideas about being a great painter," but she felt lacked the skills she needed to be a successful painter. Instead of painting, she focused on performance art, installations and photography. During her time with Asco, she collaborated and created work that reflected shared "political and social concerns." Many of her performances with Asco took place in areas where there had recently been gang conflict or fatal shootings of individuals by the police. She and the other founders of Asco had seen that a disproportionate number of Mexican-Americans were singled out for the Vietnam draft: this and "the sight of their friends returning in body bags and the elite political class's apathy to their plight scarred all the members." Asco commented on Mexican-American identity and rampant stereotyping of Mexican-Americans by the media. Valdez relates how she was "always angry" as a young person watching movies "because she never saw the beautiful Mexicans she knew on screen."

Valdez' installations are considered feminist works that defy cultural expectations of a woman's role in society. The temporary nature of her installations also tap into the "Mexican cultural practice of the impermanent."

Since the 1980s Valdez has focused on her painting. She honed her skills and invited honest critique of her first works which helped boost her confidence in her painting. Valdez's painting are bright, colorful and "seem just a little enchanted." "I've been trying to get away from the brighter palette for years," she says, "but the more I try, it just comes out." Her "vibrant" work is very emotive and has a sense of magical realism. Valdez's subject matter is often focused on the female figure or domestic scenes and settings. Her work draws on her "private experiences, the nature of which [are] distinctly painful and feminist." Valdez's multi disciplinary Avant Garde practice has encompassed various mediums, including her lesser known works in Fashion Design. Her works in fashion have been part of multiple national and international installations that have exhibited her unique Paper Fashion Designs. It was said that in a 2014 conversation at The University of Nottingham's with Lucy Bradknock Valdez described her relationship with fashion during her time within her the Asco Chicano Art collective in a way that revealed the importance fashion held in her designs as an expression of the times underlying socio-economic and political concerns as a Chicana Feminist artist.

In 2000, she showed at Patricia Correia Gallery, Santa Monica. In 2006, she showed at the Angels Gate Cultural Center. In 2011, she showed at Fowler Museum at UCLA.

In 2017 to 2018 she was part of the area wide Pacific Standard Time exhibition, her exhibit Judithe Hernández and Patssi Valdez: One Path Two Journeys. Pacific Standard Time was at the Millard Sheets Art Center. "These artists have profoundly influenced the aesthetic voices of Latinas in the latter half of the 20th century, and for the first time will be shown together."

Her work is included in the Xican-a.o.x. Body group presentation, which traveled from the Cheech Marin Center for Chicano Art & Culture of the Riverside Art Museum, California, to the Pérez Art Museum Miami, Florida, in 2024. The exhibition and accompanying publication is an expansive take on the Chicano experience and its intersection with contemporary art narratives from the 1960s to present day. Patssi Valdez is located in the show both individually at PAMMTV, and as part of Asco collective.

== Awards ==
Valdez is a recipient of the J. Paul Getty Trust Fund for the Visual Arts fellowship, the National Endowment for the Arts fellowship, and the Brody Arts Fellowship in Visual Arts. She won a 2001 Durfee Artist Fellowship.

== Collections ==
Her art work is included in the museum collections at the Smithsonian American Art Museum; the National Hispanic Cultural Center collection; the National Museum of American Art; the Tucson Museum of Art; the San Jose Museum of Art; The Cheech Marin Center for Chicano Art, Culture & Industry in Riverside, California; and the El Paso Museum of Art.

== See also ==
- Queer Chicano art
