= Mark Bryan (artist) =

American painter

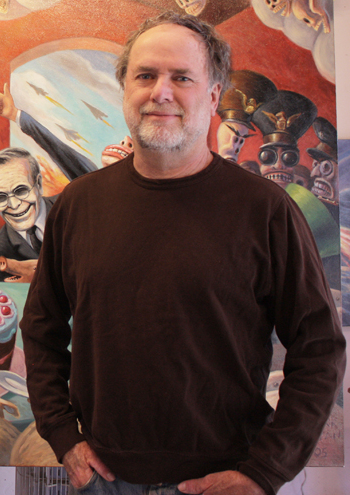
- Bryan in 2013
- Born: May 24, 1950 (age 76); Southern California, U.S.
- Education: Otis College of Art and Design
- Known for: Painter
- Website: artofmarkbryan.com

Mark Bryan (born May 24, 1950) is an American painter. His work travels in two distinct directions. Satirical works of social, political and religious comment and works which take an inward track to the imagination and subconscious. Humor and parody play a large role in many of his paintings. Style elements and influences in his work include classical painting, illustration, romanticism, surrealism and pop surrealism.

== Early life and influences ==
Raised in the middle class suburbs of Los Angeles County during the 1950s and 60s, Bryan was immersed in the popular culture of that time and place. Low budget sci-fi and horror movies, super hero comic books, Mad Magazine, surrealist art and later the psychedelic work of Zap Comix artists such as Robert Crumb and Robert Williams were all part of the esthetic and psychological mix surrounding him. These influences combined with significant political events (which included The Red Scare, Civil Rights Movement and the Vietnam War) shaped and promoted an early political awareness and continues to affect the style and content of his work.

Leaving Los Angeles in 1968, Bryan studied architecture at Cal Poly San Luis Obispo. He returned to Los Angeles in 1970 to begin study at Otis Art Institute. While completing his master's degree, Bryan shared a house and studio with Carlos Almaraz and Frank Romero. Almaraz and Romero along with Roberto De La Rocha and Gilbert Lujan founded the influential Chicano artist collective Los Four. Almaraz introduced Bryan to the Mexican Muralists' work of the early 20th century. (Diego Rivera, José Clemente Orozco, and David Alfaro Siqueiros) This exposure reinforced his belief in the value of accessible work with social/political content. In 1974 Bryan assisted Almaraz in creating a mural backdrop for the first convention of the United Farm Workers union.

Bryan cites science fiction movies and illustration, the Surrealists, Salvador Dalí, Max Ernst and René Magritte as his earliest influences. Later influences include the American Scene painters, Thomas Hart Benton, Edward Hopper, Grant Wood and illustrator N.C. Wyeth. In addition to the Mexican muralists, influence by artists with social/political content in their work include Francisco Goya, Honoré Daumier, Gustave Doré, Thomas Nast, Otto Dix, and George Grosz.

== Work and exhibitions ==
In his work, Bryan confronts the dark side of human behavior with humor, whimsy and satire. Sarah Linn states, "A prolific painter whose work has been exhibited across California and the United States, Bryan enjoys pairing beautiful imagery with ugly subject matter, creating satirical oil paintings rife with religious and political overtones. But while his works often court controversy, they also exhibit a sly, sardonic sense of humor". Julie Riggot, Pasadena weekly, wrote "Like most great art with an important message, his work communicates, if not hope, then at least a much-needed measure of levity about the human condition.",

"For me, painting is free and ready access to the subconscious, like dreaming while awake. Except for my political work, I don’t spend a lot of time planning my paintings. One image seems to lead to another like going down a corridor and opening doors to see what’s there. Not knowing where they will end up makes the process a compelling adventure. Although turning inward for inspiration is my first instinct and love, I can’t always stay inside my head and ignore what’s going on in the world. When the circus turns especially ugly or when a good idea appears, I feel the need and responsibility to make comment. Humor and satire have been my way to confront serious topics which are often too grim to portray directly."

— Excerpt from Artists Statement,

His most notable work is "The Mad Tea Party" which places the main players of the Bush administration at Alice's Mad Tea Party. This painting has been exhibited widely, including:

- Kellogg Gallery at California State Polytechnic University "Meditations on the Apocalyptic" September 2009,
- Art Object Gallery in San Jose, CA "Art of Democracy",
- Oakopolis gallery in Oakland, CA. "A Farewell Kiss",

and appears in the film, Lakeview Terrace as part of the set design.

His recent work focuses less on specific individuals and heads more towards general comments on human nature, religion, environmental destruction and the pitfalls of runaway technology.

- "Going Nuclear:Artists and activists take on Diablo Canyon" article KCET artbound project March 9, 2015.
- "Bad Buddha" (oil on canvas) exhibited in "Lowbrow Insurgence: The Rise of Post-Pop Art" Harwood Museum of Art Taos, New Mexico, Sept.2014-Feb.2015. Named by Art Business News Top twenty shows of 2014
- "Work for the Dead" (oil on canvas) exhibited in "Contemporary Landscape" Marin Museum of Contemporary Art, juror, Chestor Arnold. Dec. 2017.
- Bryans work was part of Nicholas Roukes "Artful Jesters" tour in 2006-2007 which showed at The Painting Center, Soho, NY; The Brattleboro Museum and Art Center in Brattleboro, VT and UC Davis, Davis, CA
- In 2012 "Republic of Suicide" won Best of Show in a show titled, "Visual Politics" Santa Cruz Art League, Santa Cruz, CA
- "Smokin" (oil on canvas) appears in the La Luz de Jesus Gallery 25th anniversary exhibition and companion book called La Luz de Jesus 25: The Little Gallery That Could. in 2011.
- "Bad Buddha" (oil on canvas) exhibited in Copro Gallery's 20th Anniversary Exhibition August 2013
- "Big Baby Abduction", "Exodus", "Homeland", "The Ride Home" and "Freedom's Frontier" appear in Carnivora: The Dark Art of the Automobile Exhibition and companion book at Cpop Gallery, Detroit, MI and L'Imagerie Gallery, North Hollywood, CA alongside the work of R. Crumb and Ron English.

== Education ==
- 1968–1970, School of Architecture, California Polytechnic State University, San Luis Obispo, Ca.
- 1970–1972, BFA, Otis Art Institute, Los Angeles, Ca.
- 1972–1974, MFA, Otis Art Institute, Los Angeles Ca.

== Publications ==
=== Magazines ===
- Mother Jones (magazine) Jackie Flynn Mogensen, It's been an amazing year for political artists telling Donald Trump to shove it.
- Juxtapoz Magazine, Gunnin, John. "Gallows Humor: The Art of Mark Bryan." January 2007 #72: 54–59. Print.
- Adbusters Magazine, "Politics". Jan/Feb 2006. #63 Volume 14 No. 1: Illustrations.
- The American Bystander humor magazine issue no. 3, fall 2016: Illustrations
- Fifth Estate. Vol. 42 Issue #375 (2007): Cover
- "West Coast." New American Paintings. December. Issue #31 (2000): Illustration
- "West Coast." New American Paintings. December. Issue #19 (1998): Illustration
- O’Brien, William. "Monsters in our midst." Geez Magazine. Issue 7, Fall 2007: 16–18. Cover and illustration.
- Tikkun (magazine) Korten, David. "Spiritual Awakening: A new Economy and the End of Empire." Tikkun. 24.2 (March/April): 34. Illustration

=== Books ===
- Noble, Holcolmb B.. Cheney's War Crimes: The Reign of a De Facto President. Bloomington, IN: Authorhouse, 2013: Cover illustration.
- Bryan, Mark. Logan, Pam. Pictures in My Head, The Art of Mark Bryan, San Luis Obispo, CA. Big Baby Books, 2015
- Bryan, Mark. Taylor, Christopher. Pictures in My Head, The Art of Mark Bryan, second edition, San Luis Obispo, CA. Big Baby Books, 2017
- Sprayregen, Gerald. America the Great, Boca Raton, Fl. Sprayregen Family Foundation, 2017: illustrations
- Adler, Bill Jr. Trump Corrected. Claren Books, 2017: Cover illustration.
- Shire, Billy; Gore, Janis; Sloan, Alix. La Luz de Jesus 25: The Little Gallery that Could. Culver City, CA: La Luz Press, 2011: illustrations.
- Roukes, Nicholas. Artful jesters innovators of visual wit and humor . Berkeley, Calif.: Ten Speed Press, 2003: illustrations.
- Keeney, Bradford. The Flying Drum: The Mojo Doctor's Guide to Creating Magic in Your Life. 1st. New York: Atria Books, 2011: Cover illustration.
- Barany, Les. Carnivora: the Dark Art of Automobiles. City: Scapegoat, 2008: Illustrations

=== Film ===
- Lakeview Terrace. Dir. Neil LaBute." 2008 Artwork used in set design.

== Performances ==
- "The Screaming Bunny" by Artist Mark Bryan and composer Garry Eister, Carlotta's Passion Fine Art, Los Angeles, 2007.
- "The Landscape of Hell" By Artist Mark Bryan and composer/writer Garry Eister, Cuesta College, San Luis Obispo Ca. June 1995
