= Richard Duardo =

American printmaker, visual artist (1952–2014)

Ricardo Duardo
- Born: Richard Saul Duardo; May 15, 1952; Los Angeles, California, United States
- Died: November 11, 2014 (aged 62); Los Angeles, California, United States
- Education: Pasadena City College, University of California, Los Angeles (BA)
- Occupations: Printmaker, visual artist, illustrator
- Known for: Screen printing
- Movement: Pop art, Chicano art

Richard Saul Duardo (1952 – 2014) was an American master printmaker, visual artist, and illustrator, of Mexican descent. He was known for screen printing, and was an important person within the Chicano art community in Los Angeles, California.

His work is in the collection of The Cheech Marin Center for Chicano Art & Culture, the University of California, Santa Barbara, and the Los Angeles County Museum of Art.

== Early life and education ==
Richard Duardo was born May 15, 1952, in Los Angeles, California. He was raised in the Boyle Heights neighborhood of Los Angeles. Durado graduated from Franklin High School in Highland Park.

Duardo studied printmaking at Pasadena City College, and the University of California, Los Angeles (UCLA). He graduated from UCLA with a bachelor's degree in graphic design 1976. He apprenticed under master printer Jeff Wasserman in 1977.

== Career ==
Duardo co-founded arts organization, Centro De Arte Publico, with artists Carlos Almaraz and Guillermo Bejarano in 1977.

In 1978, Duardo founded a serigraphy studio called Hecho en Aztlán. It was the first Chicano-owned serigraphy studio in Los Angeles. In the studio, he collaborated on a printmaking series with artists Almaraz and John Valadez. Duardo opened multiple studios throughout his life, the last of which was Modern Multiples.

The California Arts Council named him "Artist of the Year" in 1988.

Duardo designed album covers for Yanni and Jackson Browne. His work is in the collection of The Cheech Marin Center for Chicano Art & Culture, the McNay Art Museum, the University of California, Santa Barbara, and the Los Angeles County Museum of Art.

== Death ==
Duardo died on November 11, 2014, in his home in Los Angeles.
