= Homenaje a las Mujeres de Aztlan =

Mural by Judithe Hernández

Homenaje a las Mujeres de Aztlán is a mural painted by Chicana artist Judithe Hernández. It was painted in 1976 as part of a project by Mechicano Art Center that was funded by a grant from the National Endowment for the Arts. Hernández's mural, and the other murals part of that project, are located in the Ramona Gardens housing project in Los Angeles. Carlos Almaraz helped Hernández work on the mural. The two of them also worked together on Almaraz's mural Adelita, also located in Ramona Gardens.

== Description ==
Homenaje a las Mujeres de Aztlán depicts various generation of Mexican and Chicana women engaged in daily life and activist work like participating in the UFW alongside depictions of the Virgen de Guadalupe and the stone head of Coyolxauhqui. All of these different women are cradled by a towering central female figure raising her right hand. According to Hernández, the hand was incomplete due to her and Carlos having to vacate the mural site due to gunshots from a nearby gang dispute. She learned that the hand was later completed by residents of Ramona Gardens.

On either side of the central figure, the text reads in both Spanish and English:

Spanish:

DESDE LOS DÍAS DE LA ANTIGUA HISTORIA DE MEXICO NUESTRAS MUJERES SIEMPRE HAN LUCHADO PARA EL BIEN DE SU FAMILIA, SU PAÍS, Y SU RAZA. ESTA MURAL ESTE DEDICADO A TODAS ELLAS… LAS HIJAS, LAS MADRES, Y LAS ABUELITAS DE AZTLÁN.

English:

SINCE THE DAYS OF ANCIENT HISTORY OF MEXICO OUR WOMEN HAVE ALWAYS FOUGHT FOR THE GOOD OF THEIR FAMILY, THEIR COUNTRY, AND THEIR PEOPLE — THIS MURAL IS DEDICATED TO THEM… THE DAUGHTERS, THE MOTHERS, AND THE GRANDMOTHERS OF AZTLÁN.
