= ChismeArte =

American magazine

ChismeArte was an avant-garde Chicano magazine published by the LA Latino Writers Association (LALWA) and produced by the Concilio de Arte Popular (The People's Art Council), a California statewide arts advocacy group of Chicano arts organizations headed by Manazar Gamboa. The magazine began publication in 1976. It was produced by Guillermo Bejarano in the early 1980s. Manazar Gamboa served as Director of LALWA and Editor of ChismeArte from 1981 to 1983. Organizational members of the People's Art Council included The Teatro Campesino in San Juan Bautista, The Royal Chicano Air Force in Sacramento, Mechicano Art Center in Los Angeles, and The Galeria de la Raza and The Mexican Museum in San Francisco, and The Centro Cultural de la Raza in San Diego.

Many Latino writers have edited or published in this magazine, including Manazar Gamboa, Helena Maria Viramontes, Roberto Rodriguez, Marisela Norte, Naomi Quinonez, Sybil Venegas, and Luis J. Rodriguez, a Los Angeles Poet Laureate.

The Kennedy Library Gallery held an exhibition, "ChismeArte, ¡Y Que!: Expanding L.A.'s Chicano Aesthetic". Latino artists featured in this exhibit include Gronk, Carlos Almaraz, John Valadez and Barbara Carrasco.
