= Sybil Venegas =

Sybil Venegas (1950) is a writer, independent curator, art historian, and Professor Emerita of Chicana/o Studies at East Los Angeles College. She is renowned for her extensive historical writing, which explores Chicana feminist-based art and culture, as well as the political culture associated with the popular Dia de Muertos ceremony, a tradition observed among Chicanx communities.

== Background ==
Venegas was born in a community with a strong Chicana/o presence in Los Angeles, California. Growing up in this community allowed Venegas to explore the complexities and dynamics produced by this community through the multicultural artistic atmosphere through mediums of paintings, murals, photographs, and sculptures. Once she received her bachelor's degree in Chicano Studies and Art History, Venegas dedicated her efforts in Los Angeles to comment on and display the multicultural visual arts landscape of the Chicana/o art community by acknowledging the expansive history of Chicana/o art. Venegas' focus on Chicana/o art allowed her to dive deeper into the elements that brought this community-based art to life. She primarily focuses on how the identity of Chicano played a vital role in evolving its culture, language, style, community, and political atmosphere through art. The historical chicano visual art images and the identity tied to this community exposed Venegas to the discrimination of several Chicanas involved in the Chicano Movement (1960s-1970s) as political, social, and artistic figures. This persuaded her to gain more knowledge regarding the contribution of female gender in the art sector of the Chicana/o community. Venegas produced a powerful curatorial feminist artistic Chicana art commentary promoting a sense of resistance and political consciousness against gender-based oppression. Working with these institutions allows Venegas to bring awareness to the Chicana/o and American history through visual art and commentary.

== Early life and education ==
Venegas was born in California in the 1950s, becoming the center of the Chicano movement from the 1960s to the 1970s. This environment exposed her to Mexican Americans' class and cultural struggles, mainly how they used art to express resilience and self-expression. She pursued a higher education in Chicano Studies and Art History, which allowed Venegas to critically examine the role of Chicana culture and its relevance to art that expresses gender and cultural identity. Her research and published works mainly focus on why Chicana artists were absent historically during the Chicano movement. Her work sought to bridge the gap between Chicana art and mainstream art institutions by rejecting the marginalized notion of Chicana artists. Her academic work stresses the importance of visual works that reflect the lives of Chicana women.

== Impact and legacy ==
Throughout her career, Venegas has documented the contributions of Chicana artists, causing a pivotal shift in conversations about how Chicana artists are viewed and treated in the art world. Her works have also allowed future generations access to a broader knowledge of Chicana visual culture.Her advocacy for Chicana art has influenced significant art institutions to include more work produced by Chicana artists. She has also served as a mentor to students in the fields of Chicana/o Studies and Art History.

== Exhibitions and publications ==
Introducing herself to the complex world of Chicana art allowed Venegas to curate and write several projects that illustrated how Chicanas were fighting against gender oppression, exuding their Native American culture, and overcoming personal domestic struggles.

=== Laura Aguilar: Show and Tell Exhibition ===
One of the works that Venegas curated was the Laura Aguilar: Show and Tell Exhibition at the Phoenix Art Museum. This exhibition portrays political and personal photographs and videos created from the 1980s until 2007 by the comprehensive retrospective photographer Laura Aguilar (1959-2018). Venegas curated this exhibition as a unique way to bring awareness of how photographs that depict the Chicana/o art community and Aguilar’s nude self-portraits can deliver a powerful message regarding the identity of the lesbian and activist community that inhabits the dynamic environment of Los Angeles. Venegas also saw this exhibition as a path to illustrate how a woman's nude body placed in a nature-based environment can be connected to the spirituality and ancestry of the Native Americans within the Chicana/o community and culture.

=== Recent Chicana Art Form: La Reina del pueblo de Los Angeles de la Porciuncula ===
Another work that Venegas curated, which also offers a brief analysis of each artist and artwork involved, was Recent Chicana Art Form: La Reina del pueblo de Los Ángeles de la Porciúncula at the Laband Art Gallery in Loyola Marymount University. In this project, Venegas provides a detailed cultural and biographical overview of the works and lives of five renowned Chicana artists: Laura Aguilar, Diane Gamboa, Margaret Garcia, Barbara Carrasco, and Dolores Guerrero-Cruz. Curating this identity—and image-based exhibition allowed Venegas to portray the perspectives of these five artists on the tensions present in the distinct Anglo and Latino spheres of life. To capture these spheres, Venegas provided an introduction to these works where she expressed the idea that the feminine layer produced in Chicana art allows these female artists to resist and combat the sexist, oppressive, and inferior perspectives that have been created since the beginning of Spanish colonization and continue to be reinforced in modern Western society and culture.

=== Conditions for Producing Chicana Art ===
While Venegas did engage in curating several artwork exhibitions, she also wrote a critical essay titled For Producing Chicana Art in Chismé Arte. In this essay, Venegas highlights the struggles, such as lack of recognition, equal opportunities, and support, that several Chicanas face when indulging in the world of art. Venegas perceives these artistic obstacles as present within the artistic Chicana community due to the Anglo-American and culturally based ideal domestic and motherhood roles that these women must follow to respect their Mexican culture. Venegas provides a feeling of hope among the community of Chicana artists by emphasizing that the realm of art can help these women use their cultural and ethnic heritage to gain a new social and artistic consciousness that will help them survive the American atmosphere.

=== Chicanos en Mictlan: Dia de los Muertos in California ===
Another critical essay that Venegas produced revolved around the Dia de los Muertos ceremony and its historical upbringing in the United States atmosphere, titled Chicanos en Mictlán: Dia De Los Muertos in California. In this essay, Venegas diverts from Chicana art and entirely focuses on recounting the rituals associated with the Day of the Dead. For these rituals, Venegas also introduces how this meaningful ceremony can be traced to modern-day society in the southwestern part of the United States, specifically with the twentieth-century revival and reinvention of Aztlan in the Chicana/o community. Venegas expands on this concept by illustrating how the Day of the Dead ceremony from Indigenous Mexican colonial times has reinforced and cultivated the culture of Chicanas/os during the Chicano Movement. In this essay, Venegas ultimately illustrates how the Chicana/o community relies on the Day of the Dead ceremony to produce art that preserves its culture and Indigenous past.
