= Dolores Guerrero-Cruz =

American artist (born 1948)

- Born: 1948 (age 77–78); Rocky Ford, Colorado, US
- Other name: Dolores Guerrero
- Education: California State University, Los Angeles, University of California, Davis, University of California, Los Angeles, Otis College of Art and Design
- Employer(s): Pasadena Community College, Screen Print School and Canela Studio
- Movement: Chicano art movement

Dolores Guerrero-Cruz (born 1948) is an American artist, she is known for her contemporary art through paintings, murals, and graphic art. Her art reflects her advocacy towards the feminist movement and empowerment movement for the Chicano and Latin community.

Guerrero-Cruz now resides in East Los Angeles.

== Early life and education ==
Dolores Guerrero-Cruz was born in Rocky Ford, Colorado, in 1948, she is of Mexican-American heritage. As a result of her mother's death, her grandmother became the guardian of her siblings and her. Her family later moved to California.

Dolores Guerrero-Cruz studied art at California State University, Los Angeles, continued at University of California, Davis, and later transferred to University of California, Los Angeles. She had additional education at Otis College of Art and Design (formally known as Otis Art Institute of Parsons School of Design.

== Career ==
Guerrero-Cruz has been an advocate for Chicano social justice and feminism. In the 1970s she had been part of the art collective, Centro de Arte Público along with Barbara Carrasco and Judithe Hernández.

After graduating she began her profession at Public Art Center of Highland Park and at Self Help Graphics and Art, an arts facility located in East Los Angeles that helps artists flourish while contributing empowerment to the Chicano and Latino community.

Aside from community work through creation of city murals with art students, she was a screen printing professor at Pasadena Community College. Guerrero contributed her skills towards local foundations including ARTSTEACH UCLA and the East Los Angeles Rape Hotline and Child Abuse Center. Guerrero-Cruz became active in Royal Chicano Air Force (RCAF) in order to spread awareness on the United Farm Workers. In January 1999, Guerrero-Cruz and co-founder Juan Gómez established Screen Print School and Canela Studio. Guerrero-Cruz's usage of Chicanx representation and artistic style were influenced by artists Paul Gauguin and Diego Rivera.

== Collections ==
The Los Angeles County Museum of Art holds art pieces from Guerrero-Cruz including Mujeres y perros and Jugo de naranja. At the University of California, Santa Barbara, Guerreros work, Mujeres y Perros, was featured in the collection called Self-Help Graphics and Art archives. Guerrero was also included in the Ricardo and Harriett Romo Collection of Mexican American Art Prints with her works including Angels Nights, From Busz Words, and Raices Folkloricas.

== Artwork ==
=== Peacemakers (1985) ===
Guerrero-Cruz worked on Peacemakers from November 4 to the 7th of 1985. This piece was created through silkscreen printing. Organizations that helped funded this art piece include National Endowment for the Arts Visual Arts, California Arts Council, and Self-Help Graphics and Art where she was employed. According to the Online Archive of California, Guerrero-Cruz's piece depicts three Mexican-American children losing their heritage due to being raised in an Anglo-American society. In addition, the artwork also includes the need of peace and resolved hostilities in children in order to prevent future nuclear war.

=== Mujeres Y Perros (1987) ===
Guerrero-Cruz's image screen print was created in the year 1987. It can be found in the Self-Help Graphics and Arts Archive Collection, a part of the University of California, Santa Barbara Department of Special Research Collections. A nude women is depicted laying on a blue bed in a gray room with her eyes closed, her arms across her forehead, and her legs crossed. Beside her, the window is wide open showing the landscape of a desert with cacti, a purple sky, an orange sun, and two howling, red dogs. According to Calisphere, an organization of University of California Libraries, themes relating to this painting include women nudity, usage of animals in art, Chicanx culture, and American culture.

=== Perro en mi Cama (1988) ===
Guerrero-Cruz developed this piece from October 31 to the 4th of November in 1988. It was created through the process of silkscreen printing. Self-Help Graphics along with the National Endowment for the Arts Visual Arts and California Arts Council assisted in the funding towards this art piece. Perro en mi Cama is included in her dogs and women series of artwork where a dog is depicted laying beside a woman it successfully preyed on with a malicious satisfactory expression on its face. The Online Archive of California discusses Guerrero-Cruz's mentions of her critic on the male verbal harassment on women due to the dog metaphorically representing men in society.

=== Red Rider in the Hood (1994) ===
Guerrero-Cruz's lithograph was created in 1994 and published through Movimiento Del Rio Salado (MARS). This organization worked towards advocating Chicanx and American culture. It can be found in the Contemporary Latin American Collection at the Tucson Museum of Art and Historic Block. This lithograph depicts a yellow painted man wearing jeans, plaid shirt, and hat with his hands in his pockets. He is outside walking while looking up at a full, yellow moon covered in a ray of red-tinted clouds. One half of the man is covered in a red, furry mantle. According to the artwork's description from Tucson Museum of Art and Historic Block, the man's specific wardrobe depicts that he is a sheep disguised as a furry wolf in the night, introducing the question of who is in possession of the night.

== Exhibitions ==
- 1985 – 'Women by Women', Galeria de la Raza, San Francisco, California
- 1986 – “'Dia de los Muertos", The Photo Center, New Jersey
- 1986 – Self-Help Graphics exhibition, Atelier
- 1988 – "Committed to Print", MoMA, New York City, New York
- 2017 – "Entre Tinta y Lucha: 45 Years of Self-Help Graphics & Art”, California State University, Los Angeles (August 25 - September 28, 2017)
- 2017 – Exhibition at Laband Art Gallery, Loyola Marymount University, Los Angeles, California
- 2018 – "Spoken/Unspoken: Forms of Resistance", Sesnon Gallery, Santa Cruz, California (February 8 - March 17, 2018)
