= Judithe Hernández =

American Chicana artist (born 1948)

- Born: 1948 (age 77–78); Los Angeles, California, US
- Other name: Judithe Hernández de Neikrug
- Education: Otis College of Art and Design
- Known for: murals, paintings, work on paper
- Movement: Chicano art movement
- Spouse: Morton Neikrug
- Children: Ariel Hernandez
- Website: judithehernandez.com

Judithe Hernández (born 1948) is a Mexican-American artist and educator, she is known as a muralist, pastel artist, and painter. She is a pioneer of the Chicano art movement and a former member of the art collective Los Four. She is based in Los Angeles, California and previously lived in Chicago.

She first received acclaim in the 1970s as a muralist her artistic practice shifted over time and now is centered on works-on-paper, principally pastels, which frequently incorporate indigenist imagery and the social-political tension of gender roles.

In 1974, she became the fifth member, and only woman, in Los Four, the influential and celebrated East Los Angeles Chicano artist collective, along with Carlos Almaraz, Frank Romero, Robert de la Rocha, and Gilbert Luján. And she was later briefly part of the art collective, Centro de Arte Público along with Barbara Carrasco and Dolores Guerrero-Cruz. As early as 1970, Hernández was involved in the initial efforts of Chicano artists in East Los Angeles to organize. Of this experience, Hernández later said that "Often I was literally the only female at meetings who was not a girlfriend or wife, but an active artist participant."

== Early life and education ==
Judithe Hernández was born in 1948 in Los Angeles, California. She attended Otis College of Art and Design (formally called Otis Art Institute) where she received her BFA degree in 1972, and then her MFA degree in 1979.

When she enrolled at Otis College in 1969, she was only one of five Mexican-American students enrolled. While attending graduate school in 1972 at Otis College, she met her classmate, Carlos Almaraz. Through her friendship with Almaraz, she was invited as the fifth member to join Los Four art collective in 1974.

During her time at Otis College, Hernández studied drawing with the renowned African-American artist Charles White who became a mentor and important influence on her development as an artist. Hernández attributes much of her success to the teachers and professors who recognized her ability and encouraged her to pursue her career as an artist.

In 1971, while working as the illustrator of the Aztlán Journal, published by the UCLA Chicano Studies Research Center, Hernández illustrated the first volume of poetry by the celebrated poet Alurista, Floricanto en Aztlán. In 2013, the 40th anniversary edition of the book received three prizes at the International Latino Book awards.

== Career ==
=== 1970s ===
After graduation, she and Almaraz collaborated with El Teatro Campesino, worked on behalf of the United Farm Workers (UFW), and as members of the Concilio de Arte Popular (CAP), they worked to create an organization that united Chicano artists across the state of California. Chicano artist organizations such as the Royal Chicano Air Force of Sacramento; Galeria de la Raza, in San Francisco, and the artists of Chicano Park in San Diego were among those who participated in CAP in the 1970s.

In 1981, she and seven other Chicano muralists painted murals on canvas inside the Craft and Folk Art Museum in Los Angeles for an exhibition entitled The Murals of Aztlán. The artists were criticized in Artweek magazine by reviewer Shifra Goldman for "shedding … their cultural identity and political militance" in order to "enter the mainstream as competitive professionals." Hernández responded "why should changes in my work and socio-political attitudes be construed as compromising my commitment … while in another artist the same would be construed as personal and professional growth?"

In July 1989, marked the first exhibition of Chicano art in Europe, Les Démon des Anges, at Centre de Recherche et de Développement Culturel (CRDC) in Nantes, France. Included in the exhibition were sixteen Chicano artists (of which were three women) and this event brought international significance to Hernández's work.

During this period, Hernández also began to develop a decidedly feminist approach to moralism, due to the fact that she was the only woman working in the predominantly male artist subculture. She later recalled that, in the Chicano murals of the 1970s, male revolutionaries were often stressed without any regard to the cultural labour of women. This, in turn, had prompted her to stress the figure of females in her works. This emerging focus on women, family, and cultural memory reached a boiling point in 1976, when she collaborated on La Mujer, a mural that places the Chicana woman as the spiritual and cultural anchor between indigenous and Catholic symbolism.

=== 1980s ===
In the early 1980s Hernández relocated to Chicago and lived there for more than 25 years before returning to Los Angeles in 2010. Her final exhibition in Chicago was a major solo exhibition of new work at the National Museum of Mexican Art. La Vida Sobre Papel, opened in January 2011 and included several new series of work, one of which was the noted serial murders of women in Ciudad Juárez. According to the Chicago Weekly, "The only thing as conspicuous as the artist's skill is her message: being human is hard, a woman harder, and life as a Latina occasionally downright grisly." Hernandez says she will continue working on the series until the 800-2000 deaths are acknowledged by the Mexican government.

Studying in Chicago, Hernández expanded her designs to incorporate the recurring symbolism of butterflies, skulls, and masks, which represented migration, transformation, and the cyclical nature of life and death. Her pastel work from the 1990s turned inward, exploring the psychological and spiritual dimersions of a woman's experience, as opposed to analyzing the political narratives. This era also marked a deepening of her involvement with the indigenous cosmology, which is evident through the introduction of various Mesoamerican symbols and coloration of the paintings, which are meant to remind of the ancient memory.

=== 1990s ===
During the 1990s, Hernández continued to refine the symbolic language she had established in Chicago. The pastels of this period more explicitly addressed the emotional and spiritual aspects of women's experiences, with much of the imagery referencing indigenous cosmologies and feminine archetypes. Hernández used a palette of warm pastel colors throughout the decade and reoccurring anthropological symbols such as skulls, bones, and multicultural spiritual motifs, indicating the artist continued to be preoccupied with the life-death continuum typical of most Mesoamerican indigenous practices. As her work with color matured, she began to use more saturated color and complex textural patinas to communicate psychological states, and layers of memory to evoke ancestral space noted in later gallery accounts

Finally, although likely present in small sculptures throughout her time in California, in the 1990s, Hernández tentatively began working with butterflies more regularly, using them to symbolize both the physical crossing of borders and the internal process of self-transformation her Salvadorena characters underwent while moving in and out of her worldviews. These metaphorical works would predominate her most recognizable series in the 2000s, particularly those surrounding deal violence and Latina resiliency.

=== 2000s ===
By the 2000s, Hernández was more widely accepted as a critical contributor to Chicana feminist art history by scholars and curators, and PST materials identified her work during this decade as expanding the visual vocabulary of Chicano art through the infusion of women's spirituality, indigenous symbolism, and cultural memory into works of art from the period. Works from the 2000s continued Hernández's long-standing practice of creating memorials to women affected by violence, with multiple series addressing historical traumas, systemic inequality, and the lived experiences of and about being women of Latina descent from Americas.

=== 2010s ===
In the 2010s, Hernández's influence was more clearly apparent in museum acquisitions and curatorial framing, with institutions emphasizing her role in the feminist re-interpretation of cultural and religious iconography. Critics mentioned that the integration of Indigenous imagery and symbolix xolour relationships earmarked her as a seminal artis within the hirtory of contemporary Chicana art as well. Her continued involvement with Día de los Muertos programs and community art initiatives also connected those styles to ancestral history or modern urban life.

In 2011, Hernández was among a select group of artists whose contributions to the art of Los Angeles were honored in multiple exhibitions which were part of the sweeping arts initiative known as Pacific Standard Time: Art in L.A., 1945–1980 (PST), funded by the Getty Foundation. In 2012 Hernández was the recipient of two major awards; the prestigious C.O.L.A. Fellowship (City of Los Angeles Individual Artist Fellowship) for 2013, as well as the coveted commission to create public art for the Terminus Station of Metro EXPO LINE at Colorado & 4th Street in Santa Monica by the Metropolitan Transportation Authority of Los Angeles. The Expo Line Downtown Santa Monica station opened on May 20, 2016. "The station at the edge of the continent" features 24 mosaic glass panels designed by Hernández positioned over its two-passenger platforms. Collectively, the panels are known at "L.A. Sonata" and depict the passage of the day and the seasons using a montage of cultural icons representing the cultural and ethnic diversity of Los Angeles. It is expected to be one of the most traveled light-rail lines in the U.S.

In 2013, Hernández was one of 72 artists chosen for the first major exhibition of contemporary American artists of Latino descent at the Smithsonian American Art Museum from works in their permanent collection. "Our America: The Latino Presence in American Art" opened in October 2013. After closing in January 2014, the exhibition traveled to several other museums throughout the United States, including the Crocker Museum in California, the Utah Museum of Fine Arts in Salt Lake City, and the Hunter Museum of Art in Tennessee. In 2017, Hernández will again have work in multiple exhibitions of the Getty Foundation sponsored Pacific Standard Time LA/LA which explores the influence of Latin American art on the art of Los Angeles. Her work "The Purification" was selected as a featured promotional image for PST LA/LA.

Over her 50-year career, she has established a significant record of exhibition and acquisition of her work by major public and private collections; which include the Museum of Modern Art, Smithsonian American Art Museum, the Pennsylvania Academy of Fine Art, the National Museum of Mexican Art, the Museum of Latin American Art, the Crocker Art Museum, the Gerald Buck Collection, and the Bank of America. She has been the recipient of the prestigious University of Chicago Artist-in-Residence at the Center for the Study of Race, Politics, & Culture, the C.O.L.A. Fellowship, and the Comisión Femenil Mexicana Nacional Award for Achievement in the Fine Arts. In 2018, the importance of her status as an American artist was confirmed when the Pulitzer Prize winning Chief Art Critic of the Los Angeles, Christopher Knight, reviewed her solo exhibition at MOLAA and wrote "...Hernández’s art is churned by her marvelous color sense, which unmoors any illustrative limits of the genre."

In 2018, Hernández was honored by the National Museum of Mexican Art in Chicago with the Sor Juana Legacy Award for "outstanding lifetime contributions to arts" and in August she will become the first American-born Latina to open a solo exhibition at the Museum of Latin American Art. Also in 2018, her work "La Virgen del la Oscuridad" will become the featured image of the newly redesigned permanent exhibition "Becoming Los Angeles" of the Natural History Museum of Los Angeles County which re-opens in May. In 2019, her newest mural commission marks the return of her artistic presence to the historic district of downtown Los Angeles when her seven-story mural "La Nueva Reina de Los Angeles" is installed on the northwest residential tower of La Plaza Village at Broadway and the Hollywood Freeway.

She is married to designer Morton Neikrug, and together they have one daughter.

== Key Themes in Judithe Hernández's Artwork ==
Judithe Hernández's artwork is characterized by several key themes and artistic techniques that are deeply intertwined with her social and political activism. These elements work together to create a powerful and evocative body of work that celebrates Chicana/o identity, challenges social injustices, and reclaims indigenous heritage.

=== Celebrating Indigeneity ===
Hernández's art consistently features indigenous imagery and themes, emphasizing their importance to Chicanx identity. This is particularly evident in her early work for Aztlán in the 1970s, where she drew inspiration from Mesoamerican codices, Native American pottery designs, and mythical figures like the Thunderbird. Hernández's commitment to including indigenous imagery in much of her work is highlighted by scholar Charlene Villaseñor Black, who views Hernández’s work for Aztlán as signifying the importance of Aztlán, indigenous people, and Chicanx history.

=== Elevating Chicana Women ===
Hernández depicts strong or heroic Chicana women in many of her murals, prints, and pastel artworks. Her collaborative murals at Ramona Gardens feature feminine symbols such as Coyolxauhqui and the Virgin of Guadalupe, while her 1976 serigraph print La reina de la primavera depicts a Chicana woman in a strong, front-facing pose. As Charlene Villaseñor Black notes, Hernández helped establish a Chicana iconography that would be vital for women's inclusion in the Chicano movement. Later works by Hernández continue this positive portrayal of Chicana and/or indigenous women; for example, Les Demoiselles del Barrio (2013) is a feminist reinterpretation of Pablo Picasso's 1907 painting Les Demoiselles d'Avignon which depicts the women as warriors instead of prostitutes.

=== Confronting Violence Against Women ===
A recurring theme in Hernández's work from 2005 onward is the exploration of femicide along the Mexico border. La Santa Desconocida (2017), depicts an unnamed victim of the Juárez murders with reverence, while Juárez Quinceañera (2017) acknowledges how many victims of the femicides were indigenous women from southern Mexico. The works use symbolism and imagery to evoke the brutality of these crimes and honor the memory of the victims; for example, bloody handprints and the color red are used to reference violence, while details like the indigenous clothing, masks, and jewelry of the victims she depicts reflects their beauty and their Southern Mexican origin.

=== Reclaiming and Reshaping History ===
Hernández's art engages with history by reinterpreting artistic traditions. Her 2019 mural La Nueva Reina de Los Ángeles exemplifies this by replacing the traditional Catholic image of the Virgin Mary with an indigenous figure, symbolizing a reclamation of Los Angeles as native land. Additionally, in her L.A. Sonata mosaics, Hernández reinterprets traditional Western representations of the seasons, elevating diverse women from various cultures to positions of power and significance.

== Awards and collections ==
She received the Anonymous Was A Woman Award in 2021. She was awarded an Individual Artist Fellowship in 2013 from the City of Los Angeles. She served as an artist in residence in 2011 at the University of Chicago, in the Center for the Study of Race, Politics, and Culture.

Hernández's work is in various public collections including the Museum of Modern Art (MoMA), Crocker Art Museum, the National Museum of Mexican Art, the Vincent Price Art Museum, El Paso Museum of Art, Pennsylvania Academy of Fine Art, Smithsonian American Art Museum, Museum of Latin American Art, Los Angeles County Museum of Art (LACMA), The Cheech Marin Center for Chicano Art, Culture & Industry, and others.

== Solo exhibitions ==
- 2021 – Judithe Hernández: Dreams on Paper, Monica King Contemporary, New York City, New York
- 2018 – A Dream is the Shadow of Something Real, Museum of Latin American Art (MOLAA), Long Beach, California
- 2011 – La Vida Sobre Papel, National Museum of Mexican Art, Chicago, Illinois.
- 2010 – What Dreams May Come / Qué Sueños Quizás Vengan, Woman Made Gallery, Chicago, Illinois
- 1983 – Judithe Hernández: Works on Paper, Cayman Gallery, New York City, New York
- 1980 – A Decade of a Woman's Work, Solart Gallery, San Diego, California
- 1979 – Virgen, Madre, Mujer: Imágenes de la Mujer Chicana, Casa de la Raza, Santa Barbara, California
- 1978 – Mi Arte, Mi Raza, Los Angeles Municipal Art Gallery, Los Angeles, California

== Group exhibitions ==
This is a list of select group exhibitions by Hernández, listed by date:

- 2020 – Printing the Revolution! The Rise and Impact of Chicano Graphics, 1965 to Now. Smithsonian American Art Museum, Washington DC
- 2019 – LIFE MODEL: Charles White and His Students, Los Angeles County Museum of Art (LACMA), Los Angeles, California
- 2017 – Judithe Hernández & Patssi Valdez: Two Paths One Journey, Millard Sheets Center for the Arts, Pomona, California
- 2015–2016 – Our America: The Latino Presence in American Art, (traveling group exhibition), Delaware Museum of Art, Allentown Art Museum, Museum of Fine Arts, St. Petersburg, Arkansas Arts Center, Utah Museum of Fine Arts
- 2009 – Judithe Hernández and Sergio Gomez: Through the Labyrinth, President's Gallery, Chicago State University, Chicago, Illinois
- 2009 – Feminist Ecology: Women and the Earth, Koehnline Museum, Chicago, Illinois
- 1989–1990 – Les Démon des Anges, (traveling group exhibition), Centre de Recherche et de Développement Culturel (CRDC), Nantes, France; Centro de Arte Contemporaño Santa Monica, Barcelona, Spain; Espace Lyonnais d'Art Contemporain, Lyon, France; Kulturerhuset, Stockholm, Sweden
- 1978 – The Aesthetics of Graffiti, curated by Rolando Castellón, San Francisco Museum of Modern Art (SFMoMA), San Francisco, California
- 1974 – Los Four en Longo, Long Beach Museum of Art, Long Beach, California

== Public art ==
Public art by Hernández
Date	Title	Artist(s)	Type	Location	Notes
2019	La Nueva Reina de Los Angeles	Judithe Hernández	mural	La Plaza Village, Broadway at Hollywood Freeway, Los Angeles, California	
2019	L.A. Sonata	Judithe Hernández	mosaics	Expo Line, Downtown Santa Monica station, Santa Monica, California	
2016		Judithe Hernández	mural	EXPO Line, Downtown Santa Monica station, Santa Monica, California	
1982	Recuerdos de Ayer, Sueños de Mañana (Remembrances of Yesterday, Dreams of Tomorrow)	Judithe Hernández	mural	El Pueblo de Los Angeles Historic Monument, Brunswig Garage, Spring Street, Los Angeles, California	Los Angeles Bicentennial Mural, the central image is that of La Reina de Los Ángeles (Queen of the Angels).
1977	Adelita or La Adelita	Carlos Almaraz, Judithe Hernández	mural	Ramona Gardens Housing Project, East Los Angeles, California	In the center of the mural is a woman with a red scarf (presumably named Adelita) and on both sides of her is text written in Spanish. The work is signed as the "Los Four".
1977	Ave 43 Mural	Carlos Almaraz, Frank Romero, Leo Limon, Judithe Hernández	mural	Highland Park, Los Angeles, California	
1976	El Mundo del Barrio Sotel	Judithe Hernández	mural	Stoner Recreation Center, Los Angeles, California	restored 1997, demolished 2002.
1975	United Farmer Workers (UFW) mural	Carlos Almaraz, Judithe Hernández	mural	2nd Constitutional Convention, La Paz, California	
1974		Judithe Hernández	mural	El Teatro de la Vida, Century Playhouse Theater, Los Angeles, California	funded by the National Endowment of the Arts.
