= Gilbert Luján =

American sculptor and painter (1940–2011)

- Born: October 16, 1940; French Camp, California, U.S.
- Died: July 24, 2011 (aged 70)
- Other name: Magu Luján
- Education: East Los Angeles College, California State University, Long Beach, University of California, Irvine
- Occupations: Sculptor, muralist, painter, educator
- Organization: Los Four
- Movement: Chicano art movement

Gilbert "Magu" Luján (October 16, 1940 – July 24, 2011) was a Chicano American sculptor, muralist, painter, and educator. He was a founding member of the Chicano collective, Los Four that consisted of artists Carlos Almaraz, Beto de la Rocha, Frank Romero and himself. In 1974, Judithe Hernández became the "fifth member," and only female member of Los Four.

== Early life and education ==
Luján was born in French Camp, California, near Stockton, to parents of Mexican and indigenous ancestry from West Texas. Six months later, his family relocated to East Los Angeles, California, where he spent his childhood and adolescence, except for some time in Guadalajara in 1944 or 1945. As a young teenager, Luján was heavily influenced by the Afro-American music scene in Los Angeles, for instance listening to Johnny Ace and Mary Wells. He went to El Monte High School, graduating in the class of 1958.

After serving in the United States Air Force, Luján returned home from three years in England in 1962 and began to attend college, first at East Los Angeles College, then to California State University, Long Beach, where he earned his B.A. in ceramic sculpture in 1969 and then to University of California, Irvine, where he earned an M.F.A. in sculpture in 1973.

== Background ==
By this time of his graduation in 1973, East L.A. had become a hotbed of socio-political and cultural activity, as the Chicano Movement became a turbulent and exciting social force in the communities the U.S. Southwest. At this time, Luján began to organize art exhibits and artists' conferences to establish Chicano Art as a valid form of artistic expression. The first of these was held at Camp Hess Kramer, which was, according to Luján, "a Jewish camp that allowed Mexican-Americans to meet there to talk about educational disparities that we had in East L.A." In 1969, Luján curated a Chicano art show at Cal State Long Beach, and during the show's run, met with various artists associated with East LA art journal Con Safos. Luján was invited to become art director of Con Safos, and through this work, he met with three other like-minded Chicano artists and formed Los Four in the Fall of 1973 at the University of California, Irvine. In 1973, Los Four had their premiere exhibition at UC Irvine. In 1974, Los Four exhibited the Los Angeles County Museum of Art's first-ever Chicano Art show, appropriately called "Los Four." This was quickly followed by several other exhibitions on the west coast. Los Four did for Chicano visual art what ASCO had done for Chicano performance art; that is, it helped establish the themes, esthetic and vocabulary of the nascent movement. "Magu," the name by which Luján is most known, says of that time:

The significance of Los Four mirrored the socio-political introspection and concerns of Raza at that time besides providing some iconographic vocabulary to initiate definitions of our ethno-art forms. Our Los Four Xicano contingency ran against some Euro-aesthetic standards of the period. We, as pictorial artists, gave a visual voice to those interests of parity for our young artist constituency-culture. It was a form of cooperation binding us by our sociological circumstance, indigenous paradigms and our adopted response to unify ourselves along political cultural oriented purposes, in lieu of solely aesthetical ones.

From 1976 until 1980, Luján taught at the La Raza Studies Department at Fresno City College becoming department chair 1980. Since then, Luján worked full-time on his artwork, devoted to developing his aesthetic. During the years of 1999 to 2007, Magu held his art studio operations at the Pomona Art Colony in downtown Pomona, California, helping to garner appreciation and support of the arts in the city and surrounding communities. During 2005, he took on a position as art professor at Pomona College, one of the seven prestigious Claremont Colleges.

In 1990 Magu was commissioned as a design principal for the Hollywood & Vine station on the Metro Rail Red Line (Hollywood/Vine (LACMTA station)) in Los Angeles, California. By 1999 Magu completed a series of wall tiles and platform sculptural benches in the form of lowrider automobiles. He chose the theme song, "Hooray for Hollywood," as the signature tune for the Hollywood & Vine Metro station. A design rudder established was "light," which Luján considered another central motif in Hollywood, from the light that passed through film projectors to the sunny streets of Southern California to the creation of celebrity "Stars." The Yellow Brick Road, which was built to run from the plaza (which is currently being demolished to build a high-rise with chain restaurants and businesses) to the train platform, is a prominent motif taken from the 1939 classic movieThe Wizard of Oz, a movie which was an inspiration to Luján's work.

Magu's artwork became famous in its own right throughout the 1980s and 1990s as it used colorful imagery, anthropomorphic animals, depictions of outrageously proportioned lowriders, festooned with Indigenous/urban motifs juxtaposed, graffiti, Dia De Los Muertos installation altars and all sorts of borrowings from pop-culture. Magu states:

"My art intentions, over the years, have been to use Mesoamerican heritage as well as implementing current popular Art and cultural folk sources as the content substance to make Chicanarte."

One of his sons is the accordionist Otoño Luján, who is a member of the band Conjunto Los Pochos.

== Los Four ==
While in graduate school, Lujan and a group of friends cam together to form a group which eventually became known as Los Four. Their name stems from wanting to “something bicultural and bilingual” and ultimately it is said that Romero suggested “Los Four” which then stuck.

As a group, they are also very diverse. Almaraz was born in Mexico City, de La Rocha was born in Wilmar, Romero in Los Angeles, and Luján from California.

In 1972, they had an exhibition at UC Irvine. Since Lujan had completed his MBA at UC Irvine, he was able to secure the exhibition for the group. The Exhibition was on display for two months at the Los Angeles County Museum of Art. For the exhibition, Romeo created posters and his mother even provided food for the opening event.

== Art style ==
As an artist, Luján is influenced not only by his Chicano background, but also by Asian, polynesian, and Black art. His art also even has Western influences and has cited a fondness for, “Giacometti, Picasso, and Henry Moore,” It is through his work that he tries to unite the different cultures and attempts to get people to understand that the “Chicano is American." His art is seen attempting to bridge the identities of being both a Mexican descendant but also being American., while putting emphasis of the Chicano experience. This reflects on his art as he depicts iconic vintage cars associated with Americana while also alluding to Mexican culture through iconography such as alluding to Aztec symbols and other traditional Mexican symbols.

In his monograph, "Aztlán to Magulandia", Luján reflects upon his works and describes the life long journey he underwent for his art while looking at themes such as history, mythology, and as his own Chicano heritage.

Another key factor to Luján's art style is the human dog hybrids that are usually depicted to be the main characters in his art works. Playing with the “ancient Mexican symbol”, Luján depicts “anthropomorphic dogs” who are usually seen doing everyday human activities such as driving or going for a walk.

Lowriders are also a key player in his art which reflects the artist's strong liking towards them. In some of his works, Luján even goes as far to depict theses human hybrids being connected with lowrider such as in his art piece, Having a Car Baby.

Luján has also created this concept of "Magulandia" throughout his works. Mangulandia is seen to be an imaged setting that is usually seen throughout his works. This setting is seen to be formed from different elements based on " Mesoamerican iconography and architecture".

In the art world, Luján has helped define the "Chicano style". Despite being professionally trained, Luján returned to "grass-roots" and engaged in art including cultural elements of not only traddional Americana and Mexican sysmbols, but also Chicano elements such as graffiti.

== Artworks and exhibitions ==
Luján has been part of exhibitions such as Mapping Another L.A. This exhibition was held by the UCLA Chicano Studies Research Center in 1971. The exhibition aimed to “feature established artist grupos” and as part of Los Four, Gilbert Luján participated in the art exhibition. Mapping Another L.A. displayed a variety of works from Chicanx artists in order to demonstrate the developments that occurred in the 1960s for the sake of carving a space for marginalized groups.

Some of Luján's most notable works include the lithograph, El Fireboy y El Mingo (1988). In this piece, Lujan depicts a yellow background, with a smiling man "with flaming hair with his arm around a big-eyed dog person". La Ella Cruising (2004) is another significant work which depicts a woman driving a lowrider car engulfed in flames. Also, in Lujan's 1986 Cruising Turtle Island, he depicted another lowrider, traveling through a "wildly tropical, urban landscape, with a dog person in the lower right corner looking on".

== Installations and exhibitions ==
- Hollywood/Vine (Los Angeles Metro station)
- Los Angeles County Museum of Art
- Corcoran Gallery of Art
- University of California, Irvine
- Brooklyn Museum
- Museum of Fine Arts, Houston
- Guadalupe Center for the Arts
- Centro de la Raza, Balboa Park, San Diego, CA
- "Inaugural Museum Show" at the El Paso Art Museum, El Paso, Texas
- "Le Demon des Anges", a European Art Tour, with 16 Chicano Artists in Nante & Leon, France; Barcelona, Spain; and in Sweden
- "Caliente y Picante" an HBO Art Special
- The Cheech Marin Center for Chicano Art, Culture & Industry
