= Elsa Flores =

American painter

- Born: 1955 (age 70–71); Las Vegas, Nevada
- Education: California State University Los Angeles; Idyllwild School of Music and the Arts
- Known for: Chicano Art
- Spouse: Carlos Almaraz

Elsa Flores (born 1955 in Las Vegas, Nevada) is a well known Chicana street artist. Her mother's name was Maria Valenzuela and she was originally from a small village called San Javier located in Sinaloa, Mexico. She is one of the best known members of the Chicano street art movement.

== Early life ==
Elsa Flores demonstrated interest in arts from a very young age. She grew up on Los Angeles' east side, where Chicanos comprise a large percentage of the state's population. While a high school student, Flores received a scholarship to attend the Idyllwild School of Music and the Arts. She then studied photography at California State University Los Angeles and afterwards enrolled at the Art Center College of Design in Pasadena, where she focused on her drafting skills. While at the Art Center, she taught art and music education at Plaza de la Raza with artist Carlos Almaraz and Louie Pérez and David Hidalgo of Los Lobos. Flores occasionally performed in Los Lobos, as well as in the punk band The Knuckleheads formed with Pérez and Hildago. The latter band mixed electronic instruments with the accordion, violin and flute.

== Career as an artist ==
Flores began to gain recognition for her paintings, which have been exhibited around the world, during the 1970s. She met Carlos Almaraz in 1974, a fellow Chicano who was part of the early Chicano street art movement. Almaraz was a member of the famed Los Four artist collective. Elsa Flores and Carlos Almaraz eventually married in 1981, and had a daughter named Maya in 1983. The couple collaborated on one of the most famed Chicano murals, the California Dreamscape. While Almaraz was already an icon among Chicanos because of his murals across California (as part of Los Four and as a solo artist), "California Dreamscape" helped Flores become an icon herself among Chicano artists. The 15' x 70' California Dreamscape mural was commissioned by the California Arts Council and is exhibited at the Reagan State Building on 3rd and Spring Street in downtown Los Angeles.

In the celebratory year leading up to the Los Angeles bicentennial, Flores, Pérez and other artists collaborated to complicate the celebrations. Together with Pérez, Flores produced a multimedia event at Los Angeles Contemporary Exhibitions, which took place on September 5, 1980. Electric guitar, recordings played on tape recorders, and participants yelling at the audience were features of the event. In a related action, she photographed Pérez as "Screwy Louie" carrying a cross through the Second Street Tunnel. In 1983, she participated in the exhibition, Con Cariño: Photos of Another America, held at the University of Erlangen–Nuremberg, West Ger-many; this was the first showcase of Chicanx photography ever organized.

Carlos Almaraz was diagnosed with AIDS during the 1980s, eventually leading to his death. After his death, Flores' fame continued to grow. Her paintings have been shown, to critical acclaim, in museums and art houses in places such as Hawaii, New York City and Mexico. She has had solo exhibitions in New Mexico and in Los Angeles. Many of her other exhibitions have been group exhibitions where her paintings have been showcased alongside those of other famous artists.

On October 2023, Flores's art works were once showed at an exhibition, Carlos and Elsa, at Ortuzar in New York. The exhibition explored her emotions and artistic thoughts of her husband Carlos.
