= Centro de Arte Público =

Arts organization in Los Angeles, California, U.S.

- Formation: 1977
- Founder: Carlos Almaraz, Guillermo Bejarano, Richard Duardo, Leo Limón
- Dissolved: 1980s
- Headquarters: 5605–5607 N. Figueroa St., Los Angeles, California
- Location: United States

Los Angeles Historic-Cultural Monument
- Designated: August 24, 2021
- Reference no.: 1233

Centro de Arte Público was an American arts organization and collective founded in 1977 and closed in 1979 in Highland Park neighborhood in Los Angeles, California, U.S..

The former building was declared a Los Angeles Historic-Cultural Monument (#1233) on August 24, 2021.

== History ==
It was founded by Carlos Almaraz of Los Four, Guillermo Bejarano, and Richard Duardo. Almaraz and Bejarano were painters, and Duardo had worked as a printmaker at Self Help Graphics; all three had a connect to the neighborhood. Some sources also named Leo Limón as a forth founder. The organization focused on the creation of artwork centered on the theme of Los Angeles street scenes and work by Chicano/Chicana youth. They fused Chicano consciousness, communist teachings, and a silkscreen printing business. In the 1970s, Dolores Guerrero-Cruz, Barbara Carrasco, and Judithe Hernández actively had been part of Centro de Arte Público.

The Centro de Arte Público is one of three local arts organizations that made up the Chicano Arts Collective, including the Mechicano Art Center and Corazon Productions. After the organization moved in 1978/1979, the space was transformed into Aztlán Multiples, a printshop; and The Vex, a Chicano punk club.

== See also ==
- Chicano art movement
- List of Los Angeles Historic-Cultural Monuments on the East and Northeast Sides
