= Frank Romero =

American painter

- Born: July 11, 1941 (age 85); Boyle Heights, Los Angeles, California, United States
- Education: Otis College of Art and Design, California State University, Los Angeles
- Known for: painting
- Movement: Chicano art movement
- Spouse(s): Dian Zepeda (m. 1969, divorced) Nancy Wyle (m. 1980, divorced) Sharon Lear Dabney
- Children: Sonia Romero

Frank Edward Romero (born July 11, 1941) is an American artist considered to be a pioneer in the Chicano art movement. Romero's paintings and mural works explore Chicano and Los Angeles iconography, often featuring palm trees and bright colors.

== Biography ==
Death of Rubén Salazar (1986) at the Smithsonian American Art Museum in 2022

Frank Romero was born July 11, 1941, in the Boyle Heights neighborhood of Los Angeles, California. He was the oldest of three children in a middle class family, his parents were Delia Jurado and Edwardo (or Edward) Romero. Romero is of Spanish and Mexican heritage. Growing up they spoke English at home and Romero learned to speak Spanish later in life.

He attended the summer program at Otis College of Art and Design and in the 1950s he enrolled in California State University, Los Angeles (Cal State LA) where he befriended Carlos Almaraz. Romero studied with Rico Lebrun and Herbert Jepson. In the 1960s, he worked in graphic design for the Charles and Ray Eames studio and later for A&M Records. In 1968–1969, Romero lived in New York City with Carlos Almaraz.

In the 1970s, Romero alongside Almaraz, Roberto de la Rocha and Gilbert Lujan formed the art collective Los Four. In 1974, Los Four were the first Chicano artist to be shown at the Los Angeles County Museum of Art (LACMA).

His best known painting is Death of Ruben Salazar (1986), which was one of his police brutality series. He is also known for Nino y Caballo (A vision expressing freedom and joy) (1984), one of the three building-sized murals on the Victor Clothing Company Building.

== Personal life ==
Romero's first marriage was in 1969 to Dian Marie Humphrey (Dian Zepeda) in New York City.

In 1980, Romero married Nancy Wyle in Los Angeles, California. Nancy's parents were artist Edith R. Wyle and Frank S. Wyle, the co-founders of the Craft and Folk Art Museum in Los Angeles. Together they had daughter, Sonia Romero.

Frank Romero is currently married to artist Sharon Lear Dabney.

== See also ==
- The Cheech Marin Center for Chicano Art, Culture & Industry, an art museum and academic center in Riverside, California.
- Mixografia, print workshop and gallery
