= Robert de la Rocha =

Mexican-American artist (born 1937)

Roberto Isaac "Beto" de la Rocha
- Born: Roberto Isaac de la Rocha; November 26, 1937 (age 88); Wilmar, California, U.S.
- Education: California State University, Long Beach
- Occupations: Painter, graphic artist, muralist
- Spouse: Olivia Lorryne Carter
- Children: Zack de la Rocha

Roberto Isaac "Beto" de la Rocha (Spanish pronunciation: [roˈβeɾto iˈsak ðe la ˈrotʃa]; born November 26, 1937) is a Mexican-American painter, graphic artist, and muralist. He was part of the Chicano art collective Los Four for a few years. De la Rocha was also influential in re-establishing the traditional Mexican celebration of the Day of the Dead in Los Angeles. He is the father of Rage Against the Machine vocalist and lyricist Zack de la Rocha.

== Career ==
In 1973, he joined the influential Chicano art collective Los Four. The group, composed of Carlos Almaraz, Frank E. Romero, Gilbert "Magu" Luján, and de la Rocha, was responsible for numerous murals and public art installations in the Los Angeles area. According to Luján, he and de la Rocha emphasized "indigenous and local" aspects of Chicano art, while the other two members were more interested in the European tradition. The group was also one of the first to draw mainstream attention to Chicano art, exhibiting at the Los Angeles County Museum of Art in 1974. According to Judithe Hernández, the first female member of Los Four, de la Rocha was also a "brilliant printmaker", much whose imagery was drawn from "his [very fragile] mental state".

== Reestablishing the Day of the Dead in Los Angeles ==
De la Rocha was also influential in establishing the traditional Mexican celebration of the Day of the Dead in Los Angeles, when he, along with Chicano artist Gronk and a few others, led a procession from Evergreen Cemetery up First Street in Eastside Los Angeles. Luján later said that de la Rocha "should be given credit for initiating this process—almost single-handedly. And what he did, he didn't get funding or he didn't ask permission from anybody, he just went and did it." According to The American Prospect, he was also the art editor of the United Farm Workers publication El Malcriado. In 1974, de la Rocha, along with the other founding members of Los Four, was featured in a documentary entitled Los Four/Murals of Aztlan. In 1999, de la Rocha was featured in a joint showing with Los Angeles artist John Zender at La Luz gallery in Long Beach, California.
