= Marisela Norte =

American writer

Marisela Norte is an American writer, poet and artist living in Los Angeles. She is known for her poetry that explores the unseen city. Her book Peeping Peeping Tom Tom Girl was published by City Works Press in 2008, and her work can be found in numerous anthologies including Microphone Fiends, Bordered Sexualities: Bodies on the Verge of a Nation, The Geography of Home: California’s Poetry of Place, Bear Flag Republic, American Studies in a Time of Danger, Rara Avis, American Quarterly, and Rolling Stone's Women of Rock. She has also written for ChismeArte, the Los Angeles County Museum of Art and the Metro Transit Authority. She has been referred to as the "unofficial poet laureate of East Los Angeles".
