= Museo Alameda =

Latino museum in San Antonio, Texas, U.S.

- Location of Museo Alameda in San Antonio, Texas
- Established: April 13, 2007
- Location: 101 S. Santa Rosa St. San Antonio, Texas, USA
- Coordinates: 29.425457°N 98.498182°W
- Director: Guillermo Hoyos
- Website: www.thealameda.org

The Museo Alameda was the largest Latino museum in the United States and the first formal Smithsonian affiliate outside of Washington D.C., located in the historic Market Square in Downtown San Antonio, Texas.

== History ==
In 1996, Secretary I. Michael Heyman of the Smithsonian Institution announced a physical presence of the Smithsonian in San Antonio and gave birth to the Smithsonian's affiliations program. In May of the same year, Governor George W. Bush signed a joint resolution of the Texas legislature establishing the Museo Alameda as the official State Latino Museum.

The Museo Alameda opened to the public in April 2007, and has since showcased work from throughout the United States and all of Latin America. Past Exhibitions include: Phantom Sightings: Art After the Chicano Movement (March 2009), American Sabor: Latinos in U.S. Popular Music (June 2009), Escultura Social: A New Generation of Art from Mexico City (July 2008), Myth, Mortals, and Immortality: Works from Museo Soumaya de México (June 2008) and Azucar! The Life and Music of Celia Cruz (September 2007). The Museo has also displayed the work of several local San Antonio artists including Alex Rubio and Vincent Valdez in their 2007 exhibition San Anto: Pride of the Southside/En El Mero Hueso (December 2007) and Jesse Treviño in his 2009 exhibition Jesse Treviño: Mi Vida (October 2009). In 2011 Manuel Castillo: The Painting of a Community was an exhibit that honored the late Executive Director of San Anto Cultural Arts Manny Castillio, and his contributions to San Antonio's Westside Murals among the artist who participated were local artists who painted murals for the San Anto Cultural Arts Mural Program. Castiilo died in January 2009. The show featured works by Castillo and 16 past and present San Anto muralists who had brightened San Antonio's Westside with their work since 1996. The roster included: Valerie Aranda, David Blancas, Ruth Buentello, Jose Cosme, Adriana Garcia, Gerry and Cardee Garcia, Jane Madrigal, Cruz Ortiz, Juan Ramos, Israel Rico, Christian Rodriguez, Mike Roman, Alex Rubio, and Enrico Salinas

In August 2012, the Museo Alameda announced its impending closure on September 30, 2012, with A&M-San Antonio taking on a new five-year lease; Univision station KWEX-DT also uses the space under a sub-lease as a secondary downtown studio.

== Exhibitions ==
2012

- Prehispanic Art in West Mexico
- Guanajuato through Reséndiz' Art

2011

- Día de los Muertos: A Mexican Tradition
- Manuel Castillo: The Painting of a Community

2010

- Revolution & Renaissance: Mexico & San Antonio 1910 - 2010
- Bittersweet Harvest: The Bracero Program 1942 - 1964
- Arte en la Charrería: The Artisanship of Mexican Equestrian Culture

2009

- Jesse Treviño: Mi Vida
- Frida Kahlo: Through the Lens of Nickolas Murray
- American Sabor: Latinos in U.S. Popular Music
- Becoming American: Teenagers and Immigration, Photographs by Barbara Beirne
- Phantom Sightings: Art After the Chicano Movement
- Caras Vemos, Corazones No Sabemos: The Human Landscape of Mexican Migration

2008

- The African Presence in Mexico: From Yanga to the Present
- Dichos: Words to Live, Love and Laugh by in Latin America
- Myth, Mortals, and Immortality: Works from Museo Soumaya de México
- Escultura Social: A New Generation of Art from Mexico City
- Laura Aguilar: Life, the Body, Her Perspective
- Of Rage and Redemption: The Art of Guayasamín
- Latin American Posters: Public Aesthetics and Mass Politics
- Nosotras: Portraits of Latinas

2007

- San Anto: Pride of the Southside/En El Mero Hueso
- Azucar! The Life and Music of Celia Cruz
- Hupilies: A Celebration
- Cape
- Cantos del Pueblo: Tejano Musical Landscape
- Conjunto
- Tremendo Manicure
- Palace of Dreams: The Golden Age of the Alameda Theater

== Board of directors ==
- Rolando B. Pablos - Chairman of the Board
- Ernest Bromley
- Jorge Canavati
- Dr. Hugo Castañeda
- Helen Z. Coronado
- Pete Cortez
- Ricardo Danel
- Norma De Leon
- Dolores Ealy
- Dr. Ma. Antonieta Gonzalez
- Guillermo Hoyos
- Cosme Huerta
- Rosemary Kowalski
- Ricardo Martinez
- Alberto Milmo
- Marcelo Sanchez
- Pablo Uribe
