= Millard Sheets Center for the Arts =

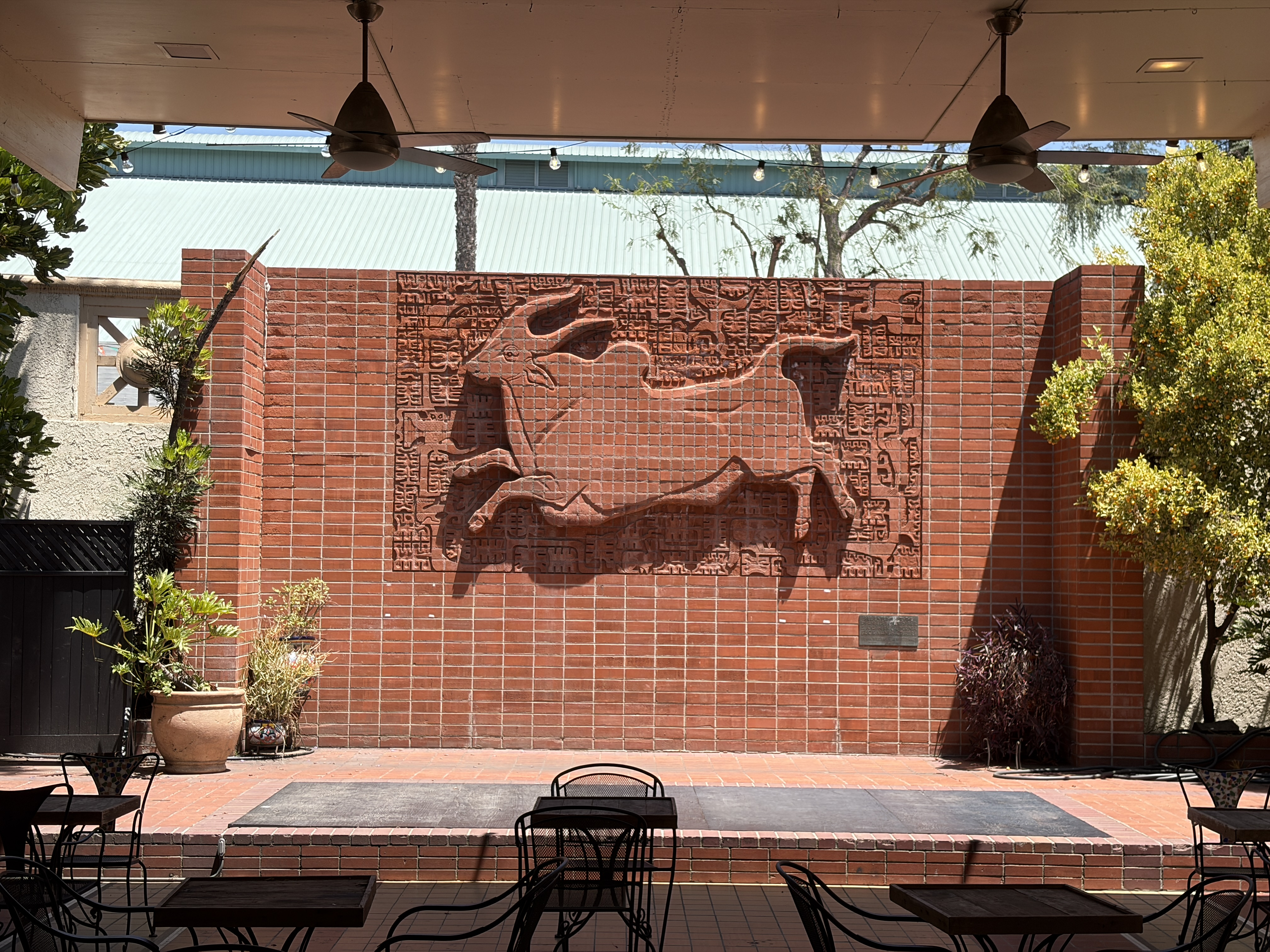
- Bull bas relief in brick
- Established: 1937
- Location: 1101 W McKinley Avenue, Pomona, California 91768
- Coordinates: 34.08097°N 117.76521°W
- Type: Art museum
- Founder: Millard Sheets
- Director: Tony Sheets
- Website: fairplex.com/tlcfairplex/programs/msac/about

The Millard Sheets Center for the Arts, named for the artist Millard Sheets, is a gallery for Los Angeles-based artists which is located on the Pomona fairgrounds at Fairplex. The Center was built in 1937 and is dedicated to art and artists solely from Los Angeles County.

== History ==
In 2013, the L.A. County Fair showcased the Center's collection of previously-un-exhibited works from approximately 60 artists that had previously had other works displayed at the Center. These works were pulled from the Center's storage facilities.

In 2017, artists Judithe Hernandez and Patssi Valdez held an exhibition " One Path Two Journeys " during the L.A. County Fair, drawing 85,000 viewers.
