= Chicano street arts movement =

The Chicano Street Art Movement, part of the broader Chicano Art Movement, took place in the Southwestern United States throughout the 1960s and 70s. Focusing on the experiences and culture of Mexican-Americans, artwork from this movement adorns public spaces, such as building walls, benches, and bridge underpasses.

== Movement origins ==
The Chicano Street Arts Movement developed alongside the broader Chicano Movement and Chicano Art Movement. Beginning in the 1960s, with the civil rights movement, the Chicano Movement emerged with two purposes. Within the Chicano community, it sought to educate about history, heritage, and cultural identity, along with promoting unity in the face of inequality and discrimination. Outside the Chicano community, it sought to promote change regarding marginalization, show cultural value, and communicate the struggles the community was facing.

It is believed that in 1967, in Venice, California, the Chicano Street Arts Movement was born. It began with gang graffiti (placas) delineating gang territory. From there, local artists turned this practice into one with significance, demonstrating community expression and involvement. From Venice, the movement spread throughout Los Angeles, and then to other Southwestern areas such as Denver, Colorado and parts of Texas.

The creation of these Chicano murals also has roots from the Mexican tradition of decorating buildings, and was heavily inspired by famous Mexican muralists like Jose Clemente Orozco, Diego Rivera, and David Alfaro Siquieros.

== Common themes ==
Murals created during this movement centered around the experiences and feelings of Mexican-Americans during this time. Unifying themes, icons, and ideas are listed below.

- Mexican/indigenous ancestry, including Aztec, Mayan, and Olmec culture
- Racism, discrimination, and oppression of Mexican-Americans
- Social and economic struggles
- Historical events
- Community unity and brotherhood
- Aztlán
- Religion/religious figures, including Jesus Christ and the Virgin Mary (Our Lady of Guadalupe)
- Violence and death

== Notable works ==
The majority of Chicano Street art was created in the Southwest United States, where the arts movement originated. California had the largest number of murals in this area, having a favorable climate for street art and a large population of people with Mexican heritage.

Chicano Park, located in San Diego, consists of painted pillars beneath the Coronado Bay Bridge. The project began in 1970, when residents heard the area under the bridge (once promised to become a park for the local community) was to become a station for the California Highway Patrol. Following community protests, planning began for the mural project, led by artist Salvador Torres. After restorations in 2011 and 2012, many of the original murals are still present, including depictions of indigenous symbols, colorful community symbols, and written messages. Today, the park is a National Historic Landmark that continues to be a community center.

The Great Wall of Los Angeles is one of the largest murals in the world. Stretching over half a mile along the Tujunga Flood Control Channel of the San Fernando Valley, it has been a symbol of interracial collaboration and community involvement for decades. Led by the Chicana artist Judy Baca, over 200 youths participated in the creation of the mural. It is in the process of being restored currently.

== Principal artists ==
Unlike many other artistic movements, the Chicano Street Arts movement was mainly driven by community, with young artists, community members, and volunteers completing the majority of the murals.

The government sponsored a large portion of projects, using community volunteers and local artists to design and make the artwork. For example, a bus bench contest took place in eastern Los Angeles, which was sponsored by an art center, a local hospital, and the city government.

The involvement of the community in the creation of this street artwork helped unify groups otherwise alienated by gang violence, geographic location, or political beliefs. The concept of art by the people and for the people was central to the movement.

== Lasting impacts ==
Through this movement, the Chicano community gained a platform to voice their issues, increased community involvement, and provided broader community education on the struggles, culture, and opinions of the Chicano community.

At the time, a trend of reduced vandalism, juvenile delinquency, and intra-community hostility was noted. This further improved the reputation of the Chicano community.

Overall, the Chicano community gained a level of respect from the rest of the United States, showing their creative contributions to society and generating interest in the artwork and Chicano community.
