= San Anto Cultural Arts =

American art nonprofit

- Abbreviation: SACA
- Formation: 1993; 33 years ago
- Founder: Manuel Castillo, Cruz Ortiz, Juan Miguel Ramos
- Type: 501(c)(3)
- Tax ID no.: 74-2852981
- Headquarters: 2120 El Paso Street, San Antonio, Texas, US
- Coordinates: 29.420272°N 98.52433°W
- President: Ernesto Olivo
- Website: Official website

San Anto Cultural Arts' mural "Familia y Cultura es Vida" on an exterior wall of the Chiquita Bakery in the Mission District of San Antonio, Texas

San Anto Cultural Arts (SACA) is an American 501(c)(3) art nonprofit founded in 1993 in San Antonio, Texas, U.S.. They operate two programs: the community mural and public art program (CMP), and El Placazo Community Newspaper and mentor program.

It was founded Manuel "Manny" Castillo, Cruz Ortiz, and Juan Miguel Ramos. Castillo led the organization as its first Executive Director from 1993 until 2009, until his death. Since 2021, SACA has taught hundreds of students about the arts and has completed more than 60 murals in San Antonio's Westside. SACA has hosted the annual Chancla Fest, with live music, free flip flops, and food since 2022.

== See also ==
- Museo Alameda in San Antonio
- National Association of Latino Arts and Culture in San Antonio
- Latino Cultural Center in Dallas
