= Los Four =

Artist collective in Los Angeles

- Formation: 1973
- Founded at: Los Angeles, California
- Dissolved: 1983
- Key people: Carlos Almaraz, Frank Romero, Robert "Beto" de la Rocha, Gilbert Luján, Judithe Hernández

Los Four (active from 1973–1983) was a Chicano artist collective active based in Los Angeles, California. The group was instrumental in bringing the Chicano art movement to the attention of the mainstream art world.

== Members ==
The Chicano artist collective Los Four originally consisted of four friends; Frank Romero (b. 1941), Carlos Almaraz (1941–1989), Robert de la Rocha (b. 1937) and founder Gilbert Luján (1940–2011). Judithe Hernández (b. 1948) became the official fifth member of Los Four immediately following the group's history-making exhibition in 1974 at the Los Angeles County Museum of Art (LACMA).

Los Four members

Carlos Almaraz, 1974

Frank Romero, 1974

Robert de la Rocha, 1974

Gilbert Luján, 1974

== History and significance ==
Judithe Hernández had become acquainted with Carlos Almaraz when they attended graduate school at Otis Art Institute in Los Angeles and he introduced her to the group. With the addition of Judithe Hernández, Los Four became one of only two major Chicano artist collectives to include a woman, the other being ASCO (Willie Herron, Harry Gamboa, Jr., Gronk, and Patssi Valdez).

In writing about the early history of Chicano art in his Reflection on the Chicano Art Movimiento, A Primer: by Armando Vazquez he wrote, "In Los Angeles there were two seminal art groups that would forge a new Chicano art sensibility". The first was Los Four, which included Carlos Almaraz, Gilbert (Magu) Lujan, Robert (Beto) de la Rocha, Frank Romero, and Judithe Hernández. All of Los Four's members were college-educated political activists who with other artists formed the intellectual vanguard of the Chicano art movement in the 1970s. Vazquez notes" It is safe to say that this grouping of artists, known collectively as Los Four, "legitimized" Chicano art in the Anglo American art world..." "Today, Frank Romero, Carlos Almaraz, Gilbert Lujan, and Judithe Hernández represent a group of Chicano artists who have attained international respect and are admired for producing original and exceptional bodies of work."

After the untimely death of Carlos Almaraz in 1989, the group has shown together less actively. In 1994, the remaining members were reunited for an exhibition entitled Los Four: Twenty Years Later at the Robert Berman Gallery. All of the members of Los Four have enjoyed successful solo careers as visual artists and have exhibited extensively in the United States, Latin America, and Europe. In 2011, Los Four was honored for their contribution to the art of Los Angeles "L.A. XICANO: Mapping Another Los Angeles" at the Fowler Museum. The exhibition was one of eight specifically honoring the contributions of Chicano artists as part of the sweeping arts initiative known as "Pacific Standard Time: The Art of Los Angeles 1975-1980". Each artist of this historically significant group is responsible for bringing well-deserved recognition to Chicano Art and, in no small way, have been instrumental in paving the way for the Chicano/Latino artists that have followed.

== Exhibitions and public art ==
After having had well-received exhibitions in the Los Angeles area, the group's breakthrough came when LACMA made the decision to mount a major Los Four exhibition titled Los Four: Almaraz, de la Rocha, Lujan, Romero (Feb. 26–Apr. 7, 1974). In doing so, LACMA became the first mainstream museum to recognize the importance of Chicano Art as a unique school of American art.

Along with their exhibitions, the members of Los Four are responsible for many of the most well-known murals of the period. Frank Romero painted several murals around Los Angeles, including Going to the Olympics on a wall of the Hollywood Freeway in downtown Los Angeles. The mural, originally created for the 1984 Olympics, was vandalized over time and "whitewashed" by CALTRANS as part of their graffiti abatement program. In 2013, the Mural Conservancy of Los Angeles restored the popular mural along with 5 others on the freeway.

Judithe Hernández painted twelve murals in the Los Angeles area between 1969 and 1982, two of which were painted in collaboration with Carlos Almaraz at the Ramona Garden Housing Projects. In 1976, she was one of the artists who painted the first 1000 feet of the Great Wall of Los Angeles. In 1981, she was commissioned by the Los Angeles Bicentennial Committee to create the city's official bicentennial mural commemorating the founding of the City of Los Angeles in 1781. The 3-story mural "Recuerdos de Ayer, Sueños de Mañana" was painted on the north facade of the Brunswig Building next to the Placita Church on Spring Street.

Carlos Almaraz also painted numerous significant murals in the Los Angeles area. With John Valadez, he painted the 200-foot-long Return of the Maya in Cypress Park, La Adelita in the Ramona Gardens Housing Project with Judithe Hernández, and California Dreamscape (completed after his death). He and Judithe Hernández also painted murals for Cesar Chavez and the United Farmer Workers Union.

Three members of Los Four have received major public art commissions from the Los Angeles County Metropolitan Transportation Authority (LAMTA). In 1992, Gilbert Lujan was awarded the commission to design the artwork for the Hollywood Red Line Station at Hollywood Blvd & Vine Street which opened in 1999. In 1995, Frank Romero painted a mural for the Wilshire/Normandie Station. And in 2013, Judithe Hernández was awarded the coveted commission to create 24 large scale individual mosaic panels for the Downtown Santa Monica EXPO Line Grand Terminus Station at Colorado & 4th Street. "The station at the edge of the continent" will be three blocks from the Santa Monica Pier and is expected to be one of the most traveled light rail lines in the U.S. Completion of the station is scheduled for 2016.

== Filmography ==
Los Four Filmography
Year	Title	Type	Notes
1974	Los Four	16mm film, 22:55	Film includes Carlos Almaraz, Gilbert “Magu” Sanchez Lujan, Roberto "Beto" de la Rocha, and Frank Romero, documents the first Chicano exhibition held in 1974 at LACMA.
1981	Murals of Aztlan: the Street Painters of East Los Angeles	16 mm film, 22:55	

== See also ==
- Murals of Los Angeles
