= Barbara Carrasco =

American painter

- Born: 1955 (age 70–71); El Paso, Texas, United States
- Movement: Chicana feminism
- Spouse: Harry Gamboa Jr.

Barbara Carrasco (born 1955) is a Chicana artist, activist, painter and muralist. She lives and works in Los Angeles. Her work critiques dominant cultural stereotypes involving socioeconomics, race, gender and sexuality, and she is considered to be a radical feminist. Her art has been exhibited nationally and internationally.

Her work was exhibited in the 1990-1993 traveling exhibition Chicano Art: Resistance and Affirmation. In 2024, Carrasco's work was included in Xican-a.o.x. Body, an expansive group exhibition on the experiences and contributions by Chicano artists in contemporary culture. The show gathered artworks from the 1960s to the present and it was first in view at the Cheech Marin Center for Chicano Art & Culture of the Riverside Art Museum, California, and later traveled to the Pérez Art Museum Miami, Florida.

== Biography ==
Carrasco was born in El Paso, Texas to Mexican-American parents. She was the oldest girl and second oldest child of four siblings. When she was around a year old, her family moved to Los Angeles. The family lived in government Veterans' housing in Culver City, since her father was a Korean War Navy veteran. She recalls that they were poor and lived off food stamps. Carrasco's childhood growing up in the predominantly Mexican-American and African-American community of Mar Vista Gardens was sometimes painful. She was teased for having lighter skin than her peers and stood out for her green eyes; being called "white girl," "green eyes" and "güera" (Spanish slang for "white girl" or "light hair"). Her experiences with being simultaneously perceived as not truly Mexican-American and being told to "take advantage of being light skinned" makes up of part of her artistic subject matter later on in life.

Carrasco was encouraged by her father to broaden her horizons, go to college and perform her artwork. Her father, who worked as a bus driver for Santa Monica Bus Lines, told her "anybody could be a bus driver but not everybody could be an artist." Carrasco's father died of a heart attack when she was twelve and it was difficult for her because they were close. Carrasco's mother, who also volunteered as a Girl Scout leader, was also artistically inclined. Her mother admired Japanese art and decorated the house with it. Carrasco felt that growing up with Japanese images influenced her sense of line. She also felt that her mother was a personal role model because she was a strong woman. However, her mother was also very protective of her girls, and she expected Carrasco to act as a role model of traditional femininity for her sisters.

Carrasco attended Catholic school from first to eighth grade. Carrasco felt that racism was prevalent there and white students were "treated better." She often drew on the tables at school instead of paying attention to her lessons. Because she was so often in her own "little world of drawing," she repeated first grade. Some of the nuns, however, noticed and encouraged her talent, including Sister Mary Ann, who continued to stay in contact with Carrasco after she left school. In seventh grade, when she made her confirmation as a Catholic, Carrasco chose Saint Joan of Arc as her confirmation name because she was inspired by her leadership.

During the summers, she and her sisters were part of a program that helped young people from the projects attend classes at the University of California, Los Angeles (UCLA). Carrasco credits the program with also expanding her horizons and encouraging her to apply for college. Carrasco attended Venice High School. Carrasco received her BFA in art from UCLA in 1978. She was the first person in her family to graduate from college. At UCLA, she was the first woman editor of the campus Chicano newspaper, the La Gente.

Carrasco was one of the first artists to join Cesar Chavez's United Farm Workers (UFW) movement. She heard him speak at UCLA when she was nineteen and she says that she "volunteered right after the speech." She did volunteer artwork for Chavez for fifteen years because she believed both in his movement and in Chavez himself. Occasionally, Chavez was able to reimburse her for art supplies, but most of the work Carrasco did was unpaid. Carrasco helped create "monumental banners" for the United Farm Workers movement and protests. Right after graduating from UCLA, Carrasco helped work on art for the Zoot Suit play, which later opened on Broadway. She also became involved with the Centro de Arte Público after UCLA. She was one of several women invited to join, reflecting a growing concern with gender equality in the art community.

In the mid-1980s, Carrasco was commissioned to create a mural, The History of Los Angeles: A Mexican Perspective which led to a great deal of controversy. The publicity generated from the controversy, however, helped Carrasco in some ways: she was chosen to go with a group of artists to the Soviet Union in 1985 and paint a mural in the Children's Museum in Yerevan, Armenia. The next year she went on a second trip to the Soviet Union and also took Dolores Huerta's thirteen-year-old son, Ricky, with her. She also went to Nicaragua in 1986 with a UCLA program called the Chicano Delegation to Nicaragua. It was during the Nicaraguan Revolution and the experience affected Carrasco deeply, making her think about death in a different context.

Carrasco received her MFA in art from the California Institute of the Arts (CalArts) in 1991. After graduating from CalArts, she didn't feel inspired and stopped producing art for about two years. In addition, the death of Cesar Chavez in 1993 created a sense of deep depression in Carrasco: she felt that there were not enough Chicano leaders and that few people could take his place.

In the mid-1990s, Carrasco married artist, Harry Gamboa Jr. Gamboa, and Carrasco had been good friends first for some time, and Carrasco liked him especially because he was "supportive of women artists." In 1994, she had a daughter, Barbie. In 1995, she was diagnosed with lymphoma and in 1996 had a bone marrow transplant to treat the disease. After the transplant, Carrasco felt that her hand was less steady for detailed work.

She is a founding member of the Dolores Huerta Foundation and serves as a board member. Carrasco was a UC Regents Professor in 2002-2003. She was recognized as a "community champion" in Los Angeles in 2014.

== Art ==
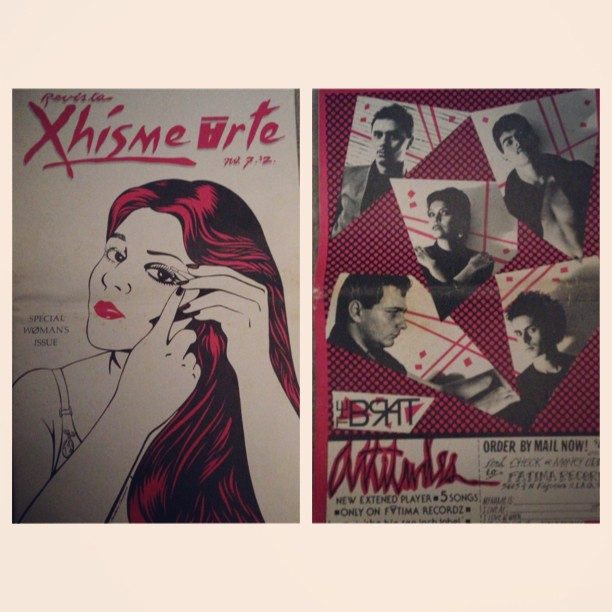
Carrasco's cover art for the magazine Xhisme Art

Carrasco is an artist, a painter and a muralist who is very involved in the community. Her artwork reveals the real history against indigenous people in the US and how they were treated. She has been a part of The Getty Museum, Self-Help Graphics, and the Center for Political Graphics. Carrasco's art is often very focused on social commentary. She uses her art to advocate change in the treatment of women. She has been publicly acknowledged for her role in making the Chicano art movement aware of sexist attitudes. She is a key figure in this art movement as she is an activist working closely with Cesar Chavez, trying to help bring justice into communities that had been constantly ignored due to their ethnicity. Her art also addresses problems that she sees with religious dogma as it relates to women. Carrasco uses her art to bring attention to issues that would otherwise remain invisible. She also helps celebrate influential women, like in her "iconic representation" of civil rights activist Dolores Huerta.

By protesting within her artwork, Carrasco created a social change for the UFW Union and the Dolores Huerta Foundation. One of her famous works, Dolores Huerta, was to honor her as the co-founder of the UFW Union which she worked alongside for 15 years. In 1970, Carrasco at the time was a student at UCLA and created her artwork, Pregnant woman in a ball of yarn. She was inspired to create this piece after hearing her brother telling his pregnant wife she was unable to go to school because she was pregnant. Chavez would see the process of her artwork come to life. He had attended one of Carrasco’s press conferences that viewed her artwork, Pesticides, in New York in 1989 which her work was shown in Times Square. Carrasco’s work has been shown in many exhibits such as in the US, Europe, and in Latin America. Some of her original mural sketches and drawings are now housed in the Permanent Collection at the Library of Congress, Washington, DC, and have been archived at Stanford University Special Collections Mexican American Manuscript Collections. Carrasco herself has stated that because she was so political, her art hasn't been taken as seriously. Carrasco credits older Chicana artists, like Santa Barraza, with creating a "positive impact" on her work. She also enjoyed working with other Chicana artists in her generation, like her friend Yreina Cervantez. Carrasco's work often uses "fine lines, sharp detail, and a hard-edged graphic quality."

Carrasco was just 19 years old when she met Cesar Chavez, leader of the United Farm Workers (UFW) and decided to work with him. Carrasco was active with the United Farm Workers (UFW), creating banners for them between the years of 1976 and 1991. Carrasco worked closely with Chavez to create flyers and banners for conventions, rallies, and supermarket demonstrations for the United Farm Workers. One of the largest banners she created for the UFW was about 30 feet by 30 feet on vinyl with Nazdar ink. Carrasco had about two weeks to complete the work and recruited a few people to help her finish it on time. The last banner she did for UFW was Cesar Chavez's funeral banner.

One of Carrasco's largest works, L.A. History: A Mexican Perspective, is a mural measuring 16 by 80 feet commissioned by the Community Redevelopment Agency of Los Angeles in 1981. To create the mural, she had seventeen young assistants, many of them gang members. The city approved the sketches of the mural but when Carrasco began the process of painting it, the agency told her to remove fourteen images from the work that depicted incidents of discrimination directed at communities of color. Carrasco refused to do so, resulting in the cancellation of the project. The mural was then put in a storage room for nearly a decade. There were fifty-one separate events depicted in the mural. Events depicted included the Japanese American internment, the whitewashing of Siqueiros's mural; América Tropical, and the Zoot Suit Riots. Carrasco worked with three different historians to ensure that her information was accurate and conducted oral interviews with "city elders." In addition to the attempted censorship, the CRA even tried to destroy the mural itself.

Carrasco refused to censor her mural because she felt "that it would be compromising the integrity of--not only my integrity as an artist but the mural, the history of L.A." Later, there was a court battle over the copyright of the mural, which Carrasco won. After a decade in storage, the Natural History Museum of Los Angeles County put the Carrasco mural on display from March 2018 to August 2019. In 2020, NHMLAC announced they were able to obtain "L.A. History: A Mexican Perspective" and, with the opening of NHMLA's new "Commons" entrance wing, the mural now has a permanent home. The Commons is open to the public without purchasing a ticket to enter the museum, so the mural can be viewed by anyone who wishes to do so, for free.

In response to the censorship of the L.A. History: A Mexican Perspective, Carrasco created the serigraph, Self-Portrait (1985) at Self-Help Graphics. Self-Portrait depicts an artist dressed as a runner crossing a finish line. The runner, carrying a paintbrush looks over her shoulder in horror as a paint roller whitewashes the mural grid behind her. The whitewashing of Siqueiros's controversial mural is referenced again on the brush itself.

In 1989, Carrasco created a computer animation, PESTICIDES!, which was shown in Times Square in New York. It was considered "controversial."

Names Can Hurt (1991), was the first piece that Carrasco did which contained text. It was acrylic on canvas and contains many of the names she was called as a child growing up in Culver City.

One of Carrasco's most iconic images is her print, Dolores (1999). The image depicts a bust of Dolores Huerta on a flat background with just her name. The image has a pop art sensibility to it. Carrasco states that she isolated her portrait in such a way to show that Huerta was "strong enough on her own."
