= Carlos Almaraz =

Mexican-American painter (1941–1989)

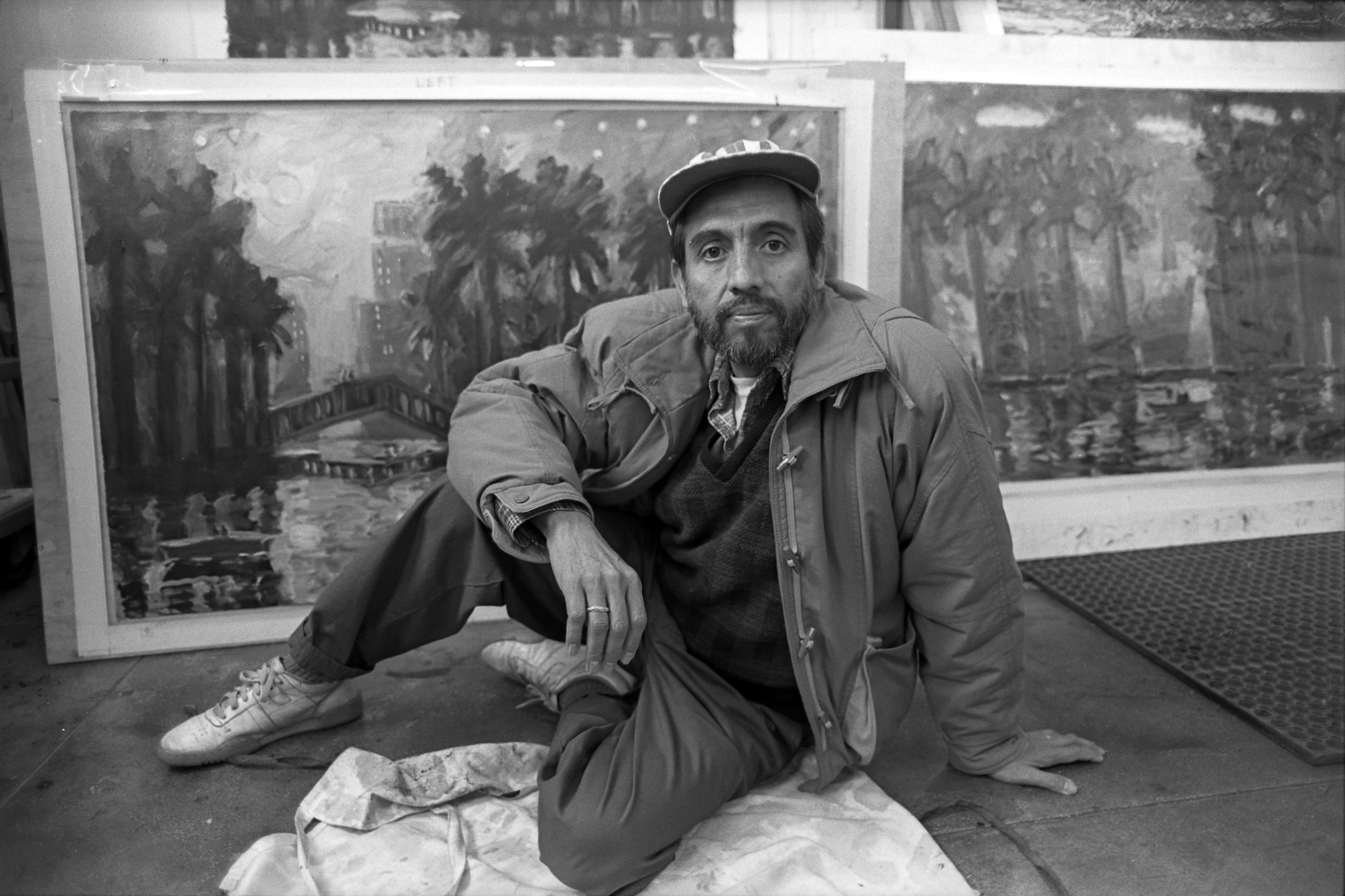
- Almaraz in 1989
- Born: October 5, 1941; Mexico City, Mexico
- Died: December 11, 1989 (aged 48); Sherman Oaks, Los Angeles, California, US
- Education: Otis College of Art and Design
- Movement: Chicano art movement
- Spouse: Elsa Flores
- Children: 1

Carlos D. Almaraz (October 5, 1941 – December 11, 1989) was a Mexican-American artist and a pioneer of the Chicano art movement. He was one of the founder of the Centro de Arte Público (1977–1979), a Chicano/Chicana arts organization in Highland Park, Los Angeles.

== Early life and education ==
Almaraz was born on October 5, 1941, in Mexico City, Mexico to parents Roe and Rudolph Almaraz. His family moved when he was a young child, settling in Chicago, Illinois, where his father owned a restaurant for five years and worked in Gary steel mills for another four. The neighborhood Almaraz and his brothers Rudolph Jr. and Ricky were raised in was multicultural, which led him to appreciate the melting pot of American culture. During his youth in Chicago, the family traveled to Mexico City frequently, where Almaraz reports having his "first impression of art" that "was both horrifying and absolutely magical", in other words "Sublime".

When Almaraz was age nine, his family moved to Los Angeles on a doctor's recommendation that his father seek a warm climate to assuage his rheumatism, and also as a result of family problems, first settling in Wilmington, later moving to the then-rural Chatsworth, where they lived in communal housing with other Mexicans. The family then relocated to Beverly Hills, and later to the barrio of East Los Angeles. Almaraz's interest in the arts, nascent in Chicago, blossomed after his family moved to California, and the sense of mobility developed after so many moves later allowed him to connect with migrant farmworkers and their children.

He graduated from Garfield High School in 1959 and attended Los Angeles City College, studying under David Ramirez, and took summer classes at Loyola Marymount University. Loyola offered him a full scholarship, but he declined it in protest of the university's support of the Vietnam War and stopped professing the Catholic faith altogether. He attended California State University, Los Angeles (CalState LA), where he befriended Frank Romero.

He became discouraged by the structure of the art department at CalState LA. Almaraz began attending night courses at the Otis College of Art and Design (then known as Otis Art Institute), studying under Joe Mugnaini. In 1974, he earned an MFA degree from the Otis College of Art and Design.

Almaraz studied arts at University of California, Los Angeles (UCLA).

== Career ==
A sketch of Carlos Almaraz holding a child, by Carlos Almaraz (1976)

Europe and the Jaguar (1982), Smithsonian American Art Museum

In 1965, Almaraz moved to New York City, with Dan Guerrero, the son of Lalo Guerrero. He left after six months to take advantage of a scholarship offered him by Otis Art Institute. He returned to New York and lived there from 1966 to 1969, where he struggled as a painter in the middle of the New Wave movements of the era.

While in New York, he also wrote poetry and philosophy. Almaraz's poems and philosophical views have been published in fifty books.

After returning to California, Almaraz almost died in 1971, and was given the last rites. It has been said that he had an experience with God during his convalescence. By 1972, he was already involved with Cesar Chavez and the United Farm Workers (UFW).

In 1973, he was one of four artists who formed the influential artist collective known as Los Four. In 1974, Judithe Hernández, who was a friend and classmate from graduate school at Otis Art Institute became the fifth member and the only woman in Los Four. With the addition of Hernández, the collective exhibited and created public art together for the next decade and have been credited with bringing Chicano art to the attention of mainstream American art institutions. He also painted for Luis Valdez's Teatro Campesino. Some of his murals are heavily influenced by the actos from Teatro Campesino.

His "Echo Park" series of paintings, named after a Los Angeles park of the same name, became known worldwide and have been displayed in many museums internationally. His Echo Park suite has been described as "primarily a synthesis of Monet, Van Gogh, and various California influences.... These paintings... show a dynamic range of color and lighting effects, from primarily dark on the left to primarily light on the right. The leftmost panel in particular demonstrates how visually exciting it could be to pierce dark fields with bright light.... Forms could be dissolved or agglomerated by rough, ragged brushstrokes. In this suite, Almaraz "freed color to become arbitrary and expressive: orange stars in the right three panels became mostly green in the left panel. Echo Park is a celebration of beauty, wonder, and love. Most of the people are romantic couples; they are paired in boats, by the side of the lake, on the bridge, and even as a bride and groom in the center, under what could very well be a statue of Venus. Almaraz transformed Echo Park into an Island of Cythera, from which one never has to disembark. The thick, textured palm trunks in the center even evoke Rococo columns."

On November 12, 1978, Almaraz wrote "Because love is not found in Echo Park, I'll go where it is found". While Almaraz may not have found love at Echo Park, he certainly found inspiration to produce paintings there: he lived close to the park, having a clear view of the park from his apartment's window.

Another of Almaraz's works, named "Boycott Gallo", became a cultural landmark in the community of East Los Angeles. During the late 1980s, however, "Boycott Gallo" was brought down.

Six Almaraz works are in the permanent collection of the Smithsonian American Art Museum, several are in the Cheech Marin Center for Arts and Culture in Riverside, CA, and one is in the Whitney Museum of American Art. Almaraz is Marin's favorite artist.

Sunset Crash, a 1982 oil in the collection of the "Cheech," has been described as "a fine example of the motif that is most prized by Carlos Almaraz’s collectors. It arguably reflects the apocalyptic characteristics of the artist’s late period, which was haunted by the AIDS crisis. In this bi-level crash, a multi-vehicle collision has caused debris — and at least one flaming car — to fall from the upper level ramp, imperiling cars that whiz by on the lower ramp. This devastation has the potential to cause considerably more ruin and bodily injury: unseen cars on both ramps could crash into the flaming cars depicted in this scene. This wholesale destruction is at odds with the beautiful colors of the landscape, which function like a rainbow behind a scene of violence." Another 2 well-known Almaraz car crash scenes are Crash in Phthalo Green (1984) and Car Crash (1987), now in the Los Angeles County Museum of Art. And the other sold to a buyer for $20,000. Crash in Phthalo Green "features what appear to be at least five fiery vehicles (one assumes there are at least two that make up the flaming, smoking form on the left). One car is falling from the elevated freeway, and others might follow. This painting provided a model of energy, dynamism, bright color, and loose technique. It also demonstrated that one doesn’t have to render a burning car in much detail — smoke, fire, and a flying tire conveyed a catastrophic crash in a more effective manner. Almaraz’s car crashes express the [film] noirish concept that a deadly disaster can strike at any moment, even on a leisurely Sunday drive. A pair of vintage cars on the lower level of the highway are unaffected, though they might still be bombarded by debris or a flaming chassis."

Greed (1989), a very unusual Almaraz with fearsome dogs, was featured in the Hispanic Art exhibition and catalogue that toured several cities. "These vicious animals" are very "unlike Almaraz’s characteristically cuddly and benign hybrid creatures."

Almaraz’s color and loose style influenced many California artists, as well as painters in other states, such as the San Antonio-based artist Adan Hernandez. Hernandez, in fact, utilized what he had learned from Alamaraz's works and turned then into antithetical paintings: "The beautiful, curvaceous orange and yellow gestural brushstrokes that float and overlap on the surface of Almaraz’s lake were hardened and congealed into linear, geometric shapes, and sometimes transformed into explosive blasts (La Bomba, 1992) or twisted metal and broken glass (The Death of Chuey, 1991) that possess their own, terrible beauty. In La Bomba, the pointed blast rays that frame the man who is blown out of a skyscraper mimic the rays in the Virgin of Guadalupe’s mandorla — but his are rays of death rather than life. Almaraz’s erotic dreams of procreative rapture in nature devolved into dark urban nightmares of explosive and violent death."

== Personal life ==
Almaraz was public about being queer, and it was documented in his journals (which were later made public).

In 1981, Almaraz married Elsa Flores, a Chicana artist. Together, the pair produced "California Dreamscape". They had one daughter.

== Death and legacy ==
Carlos Almaraz died on December 11, 1989, of AIDS-related causes at the Sherman Oaks Community Hospital, in Sherman Oaks neighborhood of Los Angeles.

He is remembered as an artist who used his talent to bring critical attention to the early Chicano Art Movement, as well as a supporter of Cesar Chávez and the UFW. His work continues to enjoy popularity. In 1992 the Los Angeles County Museum of Art honored him with a tribute featuring 28 of his drawings and prints donated by his widow. Flores continues to represent his estate.

An exhibition of his paintings, pastels, and drawings from the 70s and 80s opened in September 2011, in conjunction with the Getty Research Institute's "Pacific Standard Time: Art in LA 1945-1980". Almaraz will also be featured in corresponding "Pacific Standard Time" exhibitions, including "MEX/LA: Mexican Modernism(s) in Los Angeles 1930-1985" at the Museum of Latin American Art, "Mapping Another L.A.: The Chicano Art Movement" at the Fowler Museum.

Almaraz was the subject of am 85 minute documentary, Carlos Almaraz: Playing With Fire (2020), which was directed by his widow Elsa Flores Almaraz, and actor and filmmaker Richard Montoya.

Almaraz and Flores's papers are preserved at the Smithsonian.

== Notable work ==
Murals by Almaraz
Year	Title	Artist(s)	Type	Location	Notes
1974	No Compre Vino Gallo (Boycott Gallo Wine)	Carlos Almaraz	mural	All Nations Neighborhood Center, East Los Angeles, California	This mural no longer exists.
1976	Adelita or La Adelita	Carlos Almaraz, Judithe Hernández	mural	Ramona Gardens Housing Project, East Los Angeles, California	In the center of the mural is a woman with a red scarf (presumably named Adelita) and on both sides of her is text written in Spanish. The work is signed as the "Los Four".
1979	Return of the Maya	John Valadez, Glenna Boltuch Avila, Barbara Carrasco, Carlos Almaraz	mural	3400 North Figueroa Street (near Amabel Street) Highland Park, Los Angeles, California	Estimated at 18 feet by 200 feet in size.
c.1990	California Dreamscape	Carlos Almaraz, Elsa Flores Almaraz	mural	Ronald Reagan State Building (lobby), 300 Spring Street, Los Angeles, California	

Examples of Almaraz's work can be found in Cheech Marin's collection of Chicano art housed at The Cheech Marin Center for Chicano Art, Culture & Industry.

== See also ==
- List of notable Chicanos
