= Chicano art movement =

Movements by Mexican-American artists

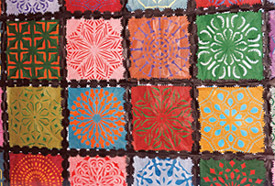
An example of Herminia Albarrán Romero's masterful papel picado.

The Chicano Art Movement represents movements by Mexican-American artists to establish a unique artistic identity in the United States. Much of the art and the artists creating Chicano Art were heavily influenced by the Chicano Movement (El Movimiento), which began in the 1960s. It shows that art can be more than something people look at; it can communicate history, culture, and social issues.

Chicano art was influenced by post-Mexican Revolution ideologies, pre-Columbian art, European painting techniques and Mexican-American social, political and cultural issues. The movement worked to resist and challenge dominant social norms and stereotypes for cultural autonomy and self-determination. Some issues the movement focused on were awareness of collective history and culture, restoration of land grants, and equal opportunity for social mobility. Women used ideologies from the feminist movement to highlight the struggles of women within the Chicano art movement.

== Chicano movement ==
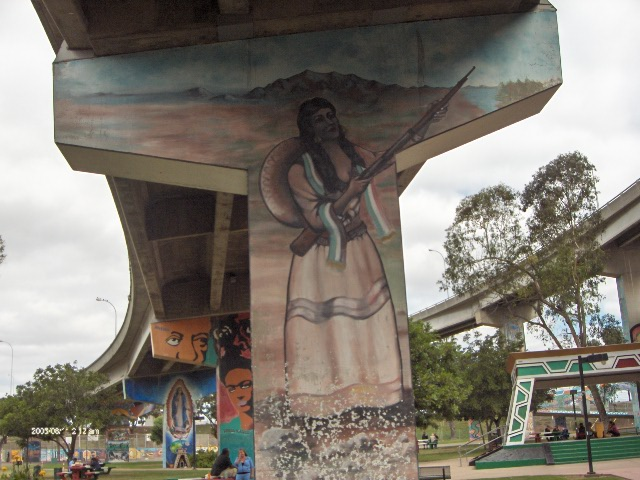
Chicano Park

Beginning in the early 1960s, the Chicano Movement, was a sociopolitical movement by Mexican-Americans organizing into a unified voice to create change for their people. The Chicano Movement was focused on a fight for civil and political rights of its people, and sought to bring attention to their struggles for equality across southwest America and expand throughout the United States. The Chicano movement was concerned with addressing police brutality, civil rights violations, lack of social services for Mexican-Americans, the Vietnam War, educational issues and other social issues.

The Chicano Movement included all Mexican-Americans of every age, which provided for a minority civil rights movement that would not only represent generational concerns, but sought to use symbols that embodied their past and ongoing struggles. Young artists formed collectives, like Asco in Los Angeles during the 1970s, which was made up of students who were just out of high school.

The Chicano movement was based around the community, an effort to unify the group and keep their community central to social progression, so they too could follow in the foot steps of others and achieve equality. From the beginning Chicanos have struggled to affirm their place in American society through their fight for communal land grants given to them by the Mexican government were not being honored by the U.S. government after the U.S. acquired the land from Mexico. The solidification of the Chicano/a struggles for equality into the Chicano Movement came post World War II, when discrimination towards returning Mexican-American servicemen was being questioned. For the most part these were usually instances of racial segregation/discrimination that spanned from simple dining issues to the burial rights of returning deceased servicemen. Chicano Movement showed how communities could come together to speak up about discrimination and demand change. It influence on art demonstrates how creativity can bring attention to issues that might otherwise be ignored.

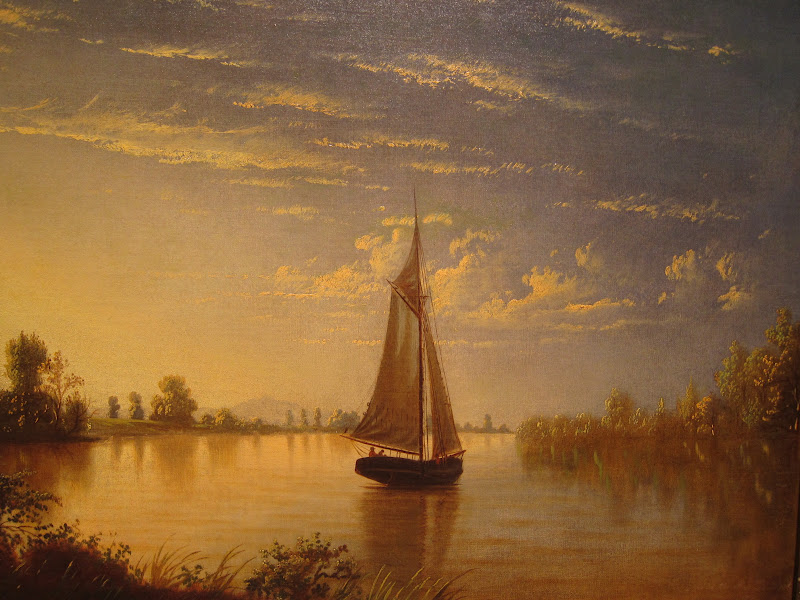
Sunset on the Sacramento River by Fortunato Arriola, 1869, Cantor Art Center, Stanford University

The formation of the National Farm Workers Association (NFWA), co-founded by César Chávez, Dolores Huerta, and Gil Padilla, sought to unionize Mexican-American labor forces to fight for improved wages/working conditions through such forms as strikes, marches, and boycotts was a notable spike in the national awareness of El Movimiento. Using symbols, such as the black eagle and creating unique poster and union art, helped raise awareness of the social issues NFWA faced, even while the workers themselves were largely invisible.

Aztlán is also another consistent symbol used by the Chicano Movement. The term unified the Mexican Americans under a term of inheritance of land and culture. Along with this common rhetoric of land claims and civil rights, an alternative to the peaceful protesting of César Chávez, Reies Lopez Tijerina attempted to resolve the issues of communal land grants in New Mexico through the creation of Alianza Federal de Mercedes and eventually resulting in attempts to secede from the Union and form their own territory, Republic of Chama.

The lasting significance of the Chicano Movement on contemporary Chicano/a writers and artists cannot be overstated.

— Sharla Hutchinson

== Chicano art as activism ==
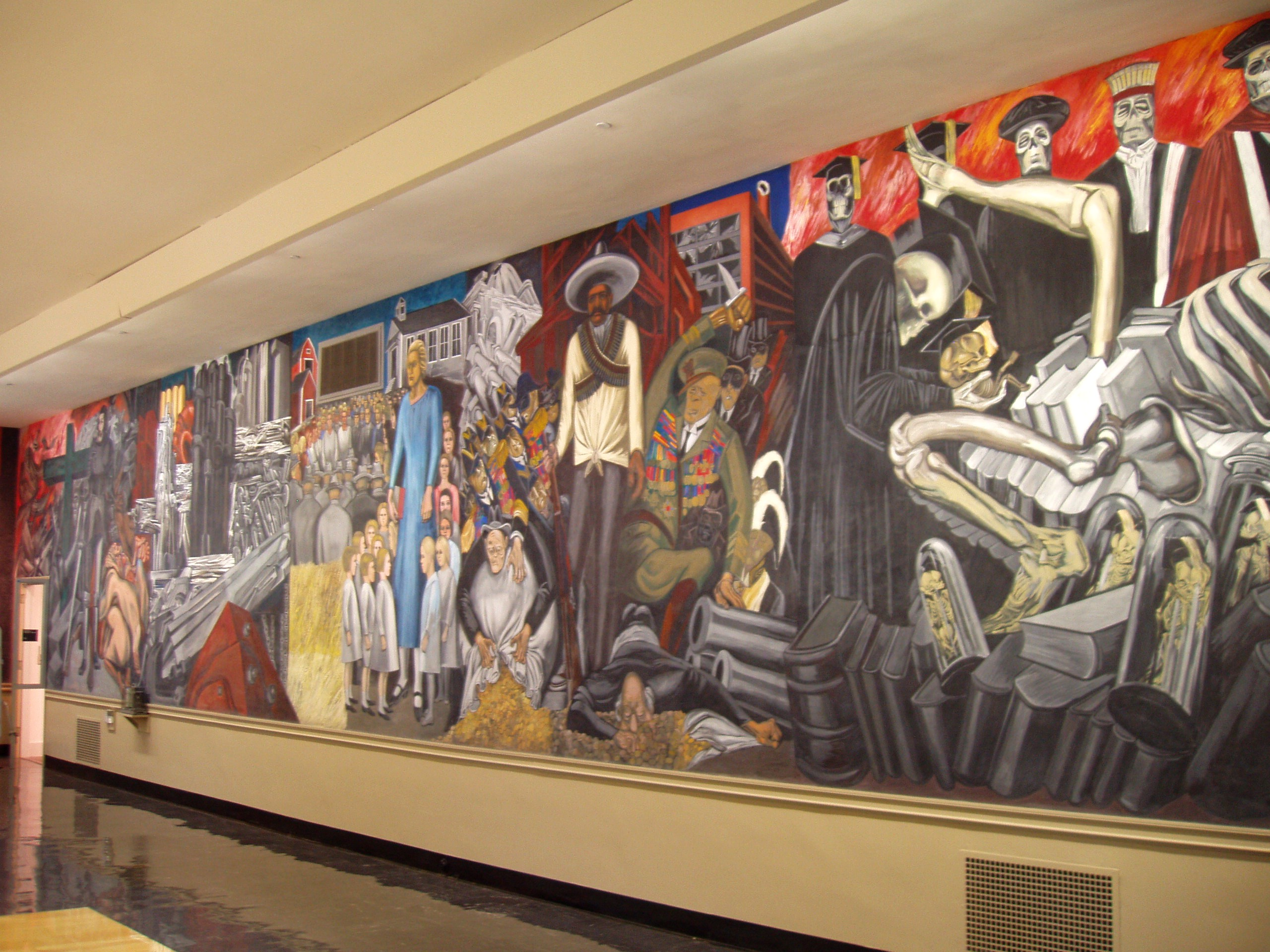
Section of mural by José Clemente Orozco at Baker Library, Dartmouth College, Hanover, NH. This is about 1/4 of the total mural.

“El Plan Espiritual de Aztlán understood art as a vehicle of the movement and of revolutionary culture”. Although the Chicano movement dissolved, Chicano art continued as an activist endeavor, challenging the social constructions of racial/ethnic discrimination, citizenship and nationality, labor exploitation, and traditional gender roles in effort to create social change. As Fields further explains, “Linked to its constitutive phased with the Chicano movement, or Movimiento, of the 1960s and 1970s, Chicano/a art articulated and mirrored a broad range of themes that had social and political significance, particularly with respect to cultural affirmation”. Activism often took form in representing alternative narratives to the dominant through the development of historical consciousness, illustrations of injustices and indignities faced by Mexican-American communities, and development of a sense of belonging of Chicanos within the United States.

Geography, immigration and displacement are a common themes in Chicano art. Taking an activist approach, artists illustrate the historical presence of Mexicans and indigenous peoples in the Southwest, human rights abuses of undocumented immigrants, racial profiling, and the militarization of the border. “Many Chicano artists have focused on the dangers of the border, often using barbed wire as a direct metaphorical representation of the painful and contradictory experiences of Chicanos caught between two cultures”. Art provides a venue to challenge xenophobic stereotypes about Mexican-Americans and the immigration law and enforcement system, while politicizing and mobilizing its audience to take action. Another common theme is the labor exploitation in agricultural, domestic work, and service industry jobs, particularly of the undocumented. Drawing from the Chicano movement, activists sought art as a tool to support social justice campaigns and voice realities of dangerous working conditions, lack of worker's rights, truths about their role in the U.S. job market, and the exploitation of undocumented workers. Using the United Farm Workers campaign as a guideline, Chicano artists put stronger emphasis on working-class struggles as both a labor and civil rights issue for many Chicanos and recognized the importance of developing strong symbols that represented the movement's efforts, such as the eagle flag of the UFW, now a prominent symbol of La Raza. Often through the distribution of silk-screen posters, made on large scales, artists are able to politicize their community and make a call to mobilize in effort to stop immigration raids in the workplace and boycott exploitative and oppressive corporations, while exemplifying dignity and visibility to an often invisible working population.

The Chicano People's Park (Chicano Park) in San Diego highlights the importance of activism to Chicano art. For many years, Barrio Logan Heights petitioned for a park to be built in their community, but were ignored. In the early 1960s, the city instead tore down large sections of the barrio to construct an intersection for the Interstate 5 freeway and on-ramp for the Coronado Bridge which bisected their community and displaced 5000 residents. In response, “on April 22, 1970, the community mobilized by occupying the land under the bridge and forming human chains to halt the bulldozers” who were working to turn the area into a parking lot. The park was occupied for twelve days, during which people worked the land, planting flowers and trees and artists, like Victor Ochoa, helped paint murals on the concrete walls. Now this park is full of murals and most of them refer to the history of the Chicanos. Some of them include Cesar Chavez, La Virgen de Guadalupe and many others. Residents raised the Chicano flag on a nearby telephone pole and began to work the land themselves, planting flowers and “re-creating and re-imagining dominant urban space as community-enabling place”. After extensive negotiations, the city finally agreed to the development of a community park in their reclamation of their territory. From here, Salvador Torres, a key activist for the Chicano Park, developed the Chicano Park Monumental Mural Program, encouraging community members and artists to paint murals on the underpass of the bridge, transforming the space blight to beauty and community empowerment. The imagery of the murals articulated their cultural and historical identities through their connections to their indigenous Aztec heritage, religious icons, revolutionary leaders, and current life in the barrios and the fields. Some iconography included Quetzalcoatl, Emiliano Zapata, Coatlicue (Aztec Goddess of Earth), undocumented workers, La Virgen de Guadalupe, community members occupying the park, and low-riders. As Berelowitz further explains, “the battle for Chicano Park was a struggle for territory, for representation, for the constitution of an expressive ideological-aesthetic language, for the recreation of a mythic homeland, for a space in which Chicano citizens of this border zone could articulate their experience and their self-understanding”. The significance of the repossession of their territory through the Chicano People's Park is intimately connected to their community's experience, identity, and sense of belonging. The Chicano Park especially meaningful because the community turned a place affected by displacement into space for art and cultural expression.

This impact not only served its local community but is also beginning to inspire a cultural shift within art spaces such as those within California. Many different institutions in San Diego and neighboring parts of California are beginning to incorporate Chicano Park's artistry into their exhibits. This growing recognition of not only the culture but the stories of Chicanos city-wide reflects a broader appreciation for the power of community-driven art. The City Clerks Archives joined forces with Chicano park and its artists to showcase an exhibit titled, “Telling Our Stories and Preserving Our Histories: The Chicano Movement in San Diego.” According to an article on the event, it featured photographs of San Diego city records and newspaper articles that helped tell the story of the Chicanx communities of Logan Heights and Barrio Logan. The event also featured many different stories inscribed on pillars that allowed the community's history to be preserved.

== Chicano art as community-based ==
"From the words of poets, to the streets of Skid Row...murals are still storytellers with some bite."—Ed Fuentes, 2014

As expressed through the Chicano Peoples’ Park, community-orientation and foundation is another essential element to Chicano art. Murals created by Chicano artists reclaim public spaces, encourage community participation, and aid in neighborhood development and beautification. “In communities of Mexican descent within the United States, the shared social space has often been a public space. Many families have been forced to live their private lives in public because of the lack of adequate housing and recreational areas”. Community-based art has developed into two major mediums – muralism and cultural art centers.

Chicano street art has drawn much influence from prominent muralists from the Mexican Renaissance, such as Diego Rivera and José Orozco. Chicano art was also influenced by pre-Columbian art, where history and rituals were encoded on the walls of pyramids. Even so, it has distinguished itself from Mexican muralism by keeping production by and for members of the Chicano community, representing alternative histories on the walls of the barrios and other public spaces, rather than sponsorship from the government to be painted in museums or government buildings. In addition, Chicano mural art is not an exhibition of only one person's art, but rather a collaboration among multiple artists and community members, giving the entire community ownership of mural. Its significance lies in its accessibility and inclusivity, painted in public spaces as a form of cultural affirmation and popular education of alternative histories and structural inequalities. The community decides the meaning and content of the work. “In an effort to ensure that the imagery and content accurately reflected the community, Chicano artists often entered into dialogue with community members about their culture and social conditions before developing a concept – even when the mural was to be located in the muralist's own barrio”. Accessibility not only addresses public availability to the community, but also includes meaningful content, always speaking to the Chicano experience.

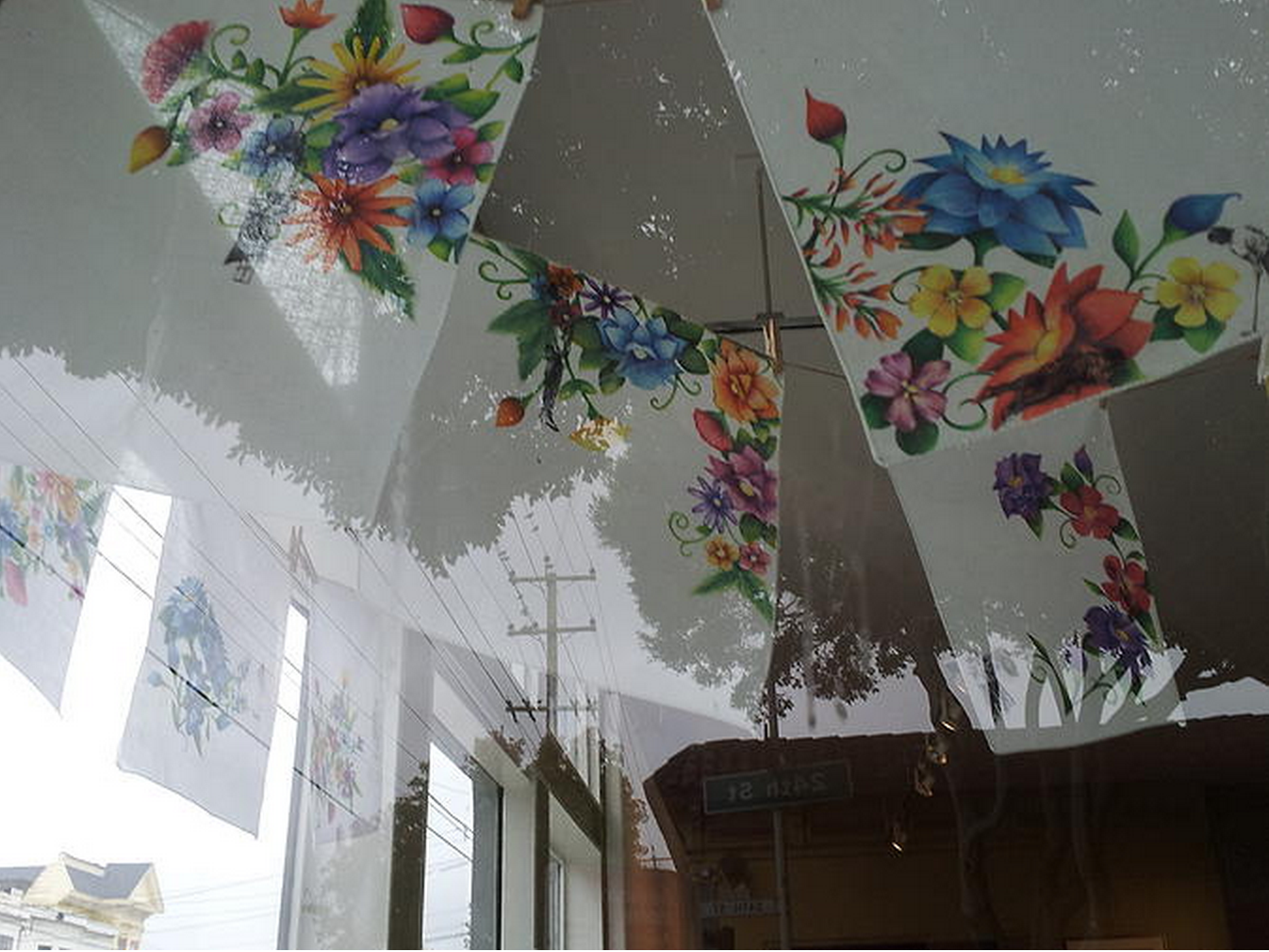
Pinches Rinches Series by Natalia Anciso, as seen from Galeria de la Raza's Studio 24, on the corner of 24th and Bryant in the Mission District of San Francisco.

Cultural art centers are another example of community-based Chicano art, developed during the Chicano Movement out of need for alternative structures that support artistic creation, bring the community together, and disseminate information and education about Chicano art. These centers are a valuable tool that encourages community gatherings as a way to share culture, but also to meet, organize and dialogue about happenings in the local Chicano community and society as a whole. “In order to combat this lack of voice, activists decided it was essential to establish cultural, political, and economic control of their communities”. To again ensure accessibility and relevance, cultural art centers were located in their immediate community. These spaces provided Chicanos with an opportunity to reclaim control over how their culture and history is portrayed and interpreted by society as a whole. As Jackson explains, these centers “did not take the public museum as their guide; not only did they lack the money and trained staff, they focused on those subjects denied by the public museum's homogenized narrative and history of the United States”.

An example of a prominent cultural art center is Self-Help Graphics and Art Inc., a hub for silkscreen printmaking, an exhibition location, and space for various types of civic engagement. Beginning in the 1970s, their goal to foster “Chicanismo” by educating, training and empowering young adults has continued to the present day. Self-Help Graphics offered apprenticeship opportunities, work alongside an experienced silkscreen printer, or ‘master printer,’ to develop their own limited-edition silkscreen print. The center also maintained efforts to support the local community by allowing artists to exhibit their own prints and sell them to support themselves financially. As common to successful cultural art centers, Self-Help Graphics supported the development of Chicano art, encouraged community development, and provided an opportunity for empowerment for the Chicano peoples.

Other community-based efforts include projects for youth, such as the Diamond Neighborhood murals where Victor Ochoa and Roque Barros helped teach youth to paint in an area that had once been overwhelmed with graffiti. About 150 teenagers attended daily art classes taught by Ochoa and graffiti declined significantly.

== Chicano art as identity and cultural affirmation ==
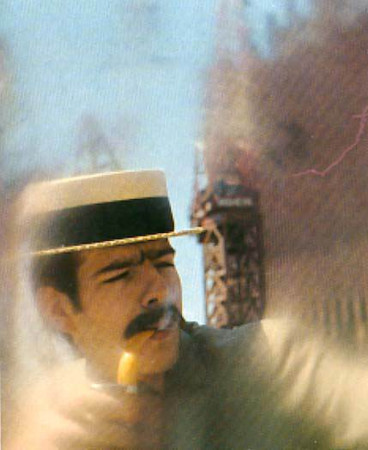
1969, a man with a hat in front of the World Trade Center under construction by Edgar de Evia.

Chicano art affirms their cultural identity through religious iconography and key elements of their Mexican, U.S., and indigenous cultures. For example, la Virgen de Guadalupe, who is an important figure in Mexican culture, is used in a socio-political context by Chicano artists as a symbol of both hope in times of suffering, and empowerment, particularly when embodying an average woman or portrayed in an act of resistance. Mexican and indigenous culture is celebrated through the practices of their ancestors (shrines, dance, murals, etc.). As new generations come to pass, art plays a role in educating Chicano youth about essential histories, traditions and values of their identity. One of the most celebrated holidays in Mexican culture is the Day of the Dead. The holiday focuses on gatherings of family and friends to pray for and remember family and friends who have died. The national holiday is celebrated in connection with the Catholic holidays of All Saints’ Day on November 1 and All Souls’ Day on November 2. Since it is so central to Mexican religious and cultural traditions, Day of the Dead has become a major component of Chicano art.

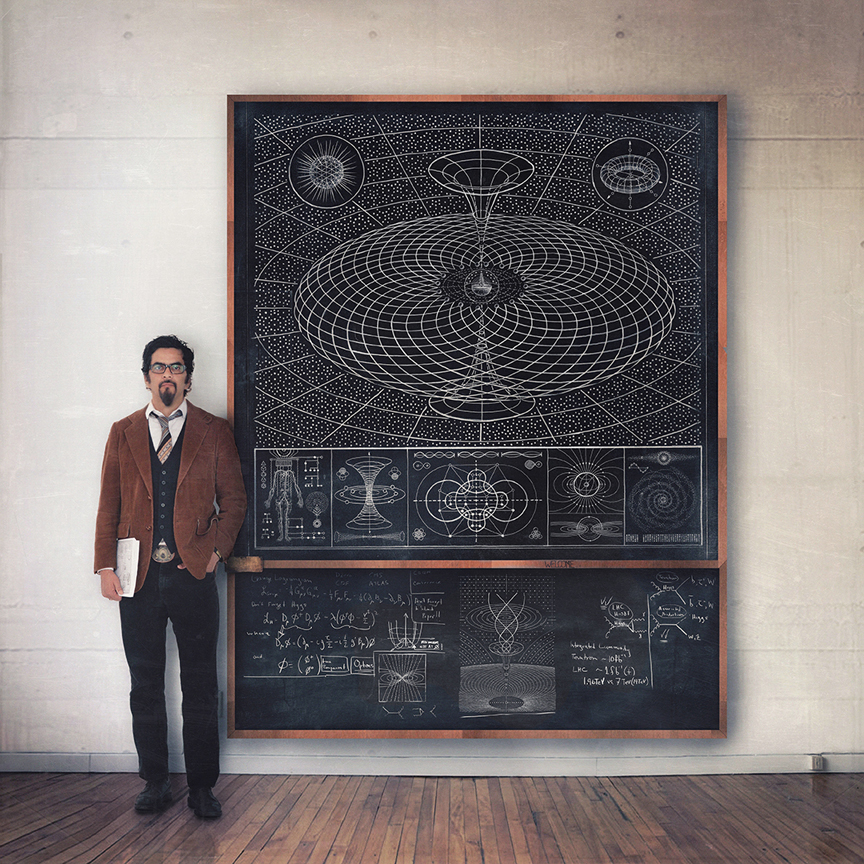
Cosmological Mysteries by Daniel Martin Diaz.

Traditions connected with the holiday include the building of private altars honoring the deceased using sugar skulls or marigolds and visiting the deceased with gifts of their favorite foods or beverages. Chicanos are able to affirm their cultural, ethnic and religious identities through daily life in the barrio, and artists draw upon these traditions, experiences and images, such as sugar skulls and La Virgen de Guadalupe, in their artwork to reflect the importance of self-determination and cultural difference to Chicanos.

Mesoamerica, a region extending south and east from central Mexico to include parts of Guatemala, Belize, Honduras, and Nicaragua, is a common theme in Chicano art, expressing their shared, yet diverse culture and identity. Going back to pre-Columbian times, Mesoamericans were inhabited by highly advanced civilizations, with their own political organization, agriculture system, mythology, writing systems, and calendars. From these roots, the emergence of radiant Chicano art were traced. Indigenous heritage of Chicanos helps suffice why some activists during the Chicano Movement and beyond portrayed Mesoamerican and Aztlan imagery in their art. “The adoption of indigenous Mesoamerican imagery allowed Chicanas/os to assert an indigenous identity and, more importantly, helped to build a communal sensibility based on spiritual and cultural concepts”. Aztlan, a mythic region expanding from the U.S. Southwest to Mexico, is common theme in Chicano art as an expression of cultural nationalism. “The powerful symbolism of Aztlan as an ancestral homeland emanated from the deep Chicana/o sense of dislocation and deterritorialization experience in the aftermath of the Mexican–American War, which resulted in the annexation by the United States of the northern territories of Mexico, as well as the earlier Spanish colonial invasion”. Demands from Chicanos for equality and social justice have roots in this long history of loss and displacement. Furthermore, Aztlan and the reclamation of their indigenous roots has become a symbol for belonging for many Chicanos, in a nation that often discriminates, demonizes and criminalizes Mexican-Americans and Latinos as a whole. “Artists, activists, and cultural workers focused on the integration of indigenous thought through the selection, reclamation, and preservation of the cultural practices considered essential to combating oppressive stance of larger society”. Many Chicanos preserve their connection to their Aztec heritage by incorporating Aztec imagery (Quetzalcoatl, goddesses and gods, livelihood, temples, etc.) into their art, from murals to prints to performance dance to music, as a way for historical and cultural affirmation.

== Women in the Chicano art movement ==
Women artists in the Chicano movement highlighted not only the struggles that Chicanos faced, but struggles that were specific to Chicanas. The Chicano art movement was a platform for Chicanas to speak about their struggles even when it was difficult, with boundaries within the Chicano movement itself and being excluded from the feminist movement.

Scholars have emphasized that the sexist and patriarchal views of the 1970s had an effect on the Chicano movement. Chicanas had to face sexist ideas from men in the Chicano movement, labeling the role of women as "sub-ordinate". The struggles of women were different than men, having to choose between family or career, and for activists, having to choose between the feminist movement and the Chicano movement.It was important to recognize the woman who participated in the Chicano art movement because they faced additional challenges while trying to represent their communities. Their work helped show that cultural equality and gender equality are both important when speaking upon representational art.

While the Feminist movement were making great strides for change, it did not include women of color in their fight for equality between genders. This movement funded the art of white women artists, reserving places in galleries and museums for only white women. According to Juan Pablo Mercado, "ethnic artists" were relegated to creating mural art, giving them the role of "street painters". Muralists in this movement needed support and resources from politicians and people in power, thus having to stray away from “overtly political themes”, making it difficult for women create art about the struggles of women.

Artists like Judithe Hernandez and Judy Baca made strides to break gender stereotypes and include themselves in the Chicano art movement. Both of these artists have spoken about the challenge of choosing to be a part of the feminist movement or the Chicano art movement. Judy Baca recalls, "I began a very long period of time straddling two lives - the feminist information and life that supported my growth as a woman, and my community life which was in the Latino community as I worked intently in the neighborhoods. And they never really met. They were constantly separated."

Judy Baca along with the Social and Public Art Resource center (SPARC), created a mural called The Great Wall of Los Angeles, a mural that depicted the history of California from the perspective of women and minorities. Judy Baca has brought in many women artists to contribute to this mural over the years.

Judithe Hernandez was one of the artists that created art centering Chicana women, and was a part of an art collective, consisting of 4 other male artists, called Los Four.

== La Virgen De Guadalupe in Chicana art ==
Many Chicana artists looked to La Virgen de Guadalupe as a dominant icon and sought to redefine her meaning. Scholars point to how ubiquitous the Virgin Mary is in Mexican households as a cultural icon and symbol of femininity. Redefining her image was controversial because some in the religious and art world took offense to the revisions Chicana artist took on La Virgen de Guadalupe.

For example, Chicana artist Yolanda Lopez remodels the portrait of the Virgin of Guadalupe into images of working women. Yolanda transforms the Virgen Mary from a deity into a laborious-driven immigrant mother that provides for their family. Specifically in Yolanda Lopez's artwork: “Mother: Our Lady of Guadalupe,” she portrays a wage-earning woman sewing the holy veil. Yolanda Lopez embodied La Virgen de Guadalupe as a brown working woman that brought controversy to her paintings.

In another example, Alma Lopez’s paintings generated controversy due to the representation of queer sexuality contesting La Virgen de Guadalupe religious meaning. Alma Lopez, a queer Chicana artist, uses La Virgen de Guadalupe to create a series of depictions of La Virgen de Guadalupe as a sexual image in contrast to virginal purity. In Alma Lopez's artwork “Encuentro” queerness is depicted by showing La Virgen and La Sirena in love, evoking acceptance of non-heterosexual orientation, contrary to her heterosexual symbol of innocence.

Additionally, Chicana Artist Ester Hernandez utilizes the image of La Virgen as a political symbol fighting for the rights of Chicano/as. Hernández in “La Virgen de Guadalupe Defendiendo Los Derechos de los Xicanos” dresses La Virgen de Guadalupe in a karate Gi and poses her in an impassioned kicking stance. Ester Hernandez juxtaposes the meaning of La Virgen as a calm nonviolent peace symbol into an image that evokes force and strength.

== Chicano art as life in the barrio ==
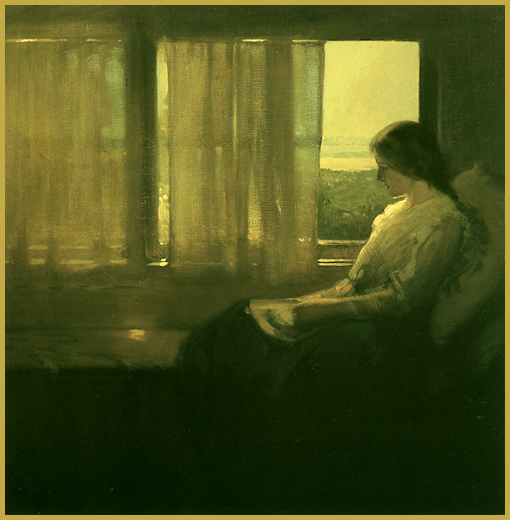
Afternoon in Piedmont (Elsie Whitaker Martinez) by Xavier Martinez, ca. 1908

Another expression of Chicano identity through their art is their depictions of life in the barrio - Spanish-speaking, Latino neighborhoods in a city or town. Often the barrios, as ethnic enclaves, have long histories of dislocation, marginalization, poverty, and inequity in access social services. In the United States, barrios can also refer to the geographical “turf” claimed by Latino gangs, most commonly limited to Chicano gangs in California. However, it was in these barrios that the most interesting forms of art were made by the Chicano community, particularly lowrider cars and bicycles, and graffiti. A very popular style of car, even to this day, emerged from Chicano barrios, known as a “.” A lowrider is a style of car that sits lower to the ground than most other cars. Many lowriders have their suspension systems modified with hydraulic suspension so that the car can change height at the flip of a switch. Lowriding originated in the 1930s and blossomed in Southwestern Chicano communities during the post-war prosperity of the ‘50s. Initially, youth who were dressed in the “pachuco” style would place sandbags in the trunk of their customized cars in order to create a lowered effect. However, this method was quickly replaced by lowering blocks, cut spring coils, z’ed frames and drop spindles. The goal was to cruise as slowly as possible so that people could see what types of customizations were done to your car. Lowrider customizations consist of sun visors, fender skirts, bug deflectors, and swamp coolers. Expensive custom paint jobs are also common such as metal oxide flake or pearl flake, clear coat, metal leaf, airbrushed murals or script, pinstripes, and flames. Gold or chrome spoke wheels or rims such as Astro Supremes, Cragers, Tru spokes, Crowns, Daytons and Zeniths are also common. Many cars have the modification of having suicide doors, or doors which open in the opposite direction to a standard car door, scissor doors that open vertically, or gull-wing doors that open towards the roof, swinging up. Since the early 1990s, lowriders have become common in urban youth culture in general, primarily in West Coast hip hop. The lowriding scene is diverse including many different cultures, vehicle makes and visual styles; however, it remains an important part of the Chicano community and identity.

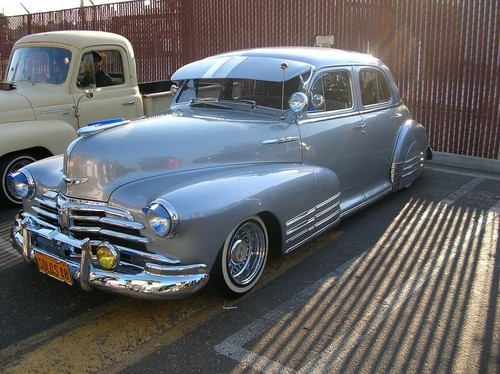
Lowrider

Chicano art even embraced the vandalistic expressions of graffiti. Art in the barrio also incorporates graffiti as a form of artistic expression, often associated with subcultures that rebel against authority. Graffiti has origins in the beginnings of hip hop culture in the 1970s in New York City, alongside rhyming, b-boying, and beats. It was used to publicly display their artistic expressions with their social and political opinions in response to their lack of access to museums and art institutions, and the continuous strife, discrimination, and struggle of living in the city. Because graffiti is illegal in most cases, this form of art has flourished in the underground, requiring little money and providing an opportunity to voice what is often excluded from dominant histories and media. From here, although graffiti remains the major form of street art, other mediums have evolved - including stenciling, stickers, and wheatpasting. Graffiti often has negative associations with serving territorial purposes for gangs, displaying tags and logos that differentiate certain groups from others, therefore marking their “turf”. Within Chicano barrios, gangs use their own form of graffiti or tagging to mark territory or to serve as an indicator of gang-related activities. Gang members also often use graffiti to designate membership, differentiate rivals and alliances, and mark ideological borders. Imagery of gang-related graffiti often consists of cryptic symbols and initials with unique calligraphy styles. Graffiti is arguably perceived as unacceptable, claimed to degrade the “look” or value of properties’ walls or buildings in a way that is not presentable.

On the other hand, Chicano artists also use graffiti as a tool, to express their political opinions, indigenous heritage, cultural and religious imagery, and counter-narratives to dominant portrayals of Chicano life in the barrios. Similar to other forms of art within the Chicano Movement (silk-screen printing, murals, etc.), graffiti has become another tool of resistance, reclamation, and empowerment as Chicanos make their own space for expression and popular education. Graffiti is now commonly recognized as a form of public art, embraced by museums, art critics, and art institutions. But its significance for many Chicanos remains in the barrios, reiterating the importance of accessibility and inclusion in relation to their identity and community in their artwork. In times of conflict, such murals have offered public modes communication and self-expression for members of these socially, ethnically and racially marginalized communities, and have become effective tools in facilitating dialogue, challenging injustices and stereotypes that impact their neighborhoods and peoples, and in the end, elevating their community.

Rasquachismo is very much a part of Chicano art. It involves doing more with less, and is a reflection of the socioeconomic and political situation that many Chicanos grew up with. Using everyday materials, such as paper plates, and elevating it into art, is one type of rasquachismo. Other examples contrast low and high art subjects.

== Important exhibitions and collections ==
- Cheech Marin Collection: one of the largest private collections of Chicano art, collected by Cheech Marin. Since June, 2022, it has been housed at The Cheech Marin Center for Chicano Art, Culture & Industry in Riverside, California.
- Chicano Art: Resistance and Affirmation (CARA): a touring exhibition that visited ten United States cities from 1990 to 1993.
- Chicano Visions: American Painters on the Verge, curated by René Yañez: a touring exhibition which visited twelve cities in the United States from 2001 to 2007.

=== Chicano cultural centers ===
- Acción Latina in San Francisco, California.
- Avenue 50 Gallery, Highland Park, California
- Centro Cultural de la Raza, in San Diego's Balboa Park in California
- Centro de Arte Público in Los Angeles, California
- Chicano Park in San Diego, California
- Galería de la Raza, in San Francisco, California
- Mexican Heritage Plaza, in San Jose, California
- Mission Cultural Center for Latino Arts, in San Francisco, California
- Plaza de la Raza Gallery, Los Angeles, California
- San Anto Cultural Arts in San Antonio, Texas
- Self-Help Graphics and Art Inc, in Los Angeles, California
- Social and Public Art Resource Center (SPARC), in Venice, California

=== Chicano art collectives ===
- Mexican American Liberation Art Front (MALAF) (1968–1970)
- ASCO (1971–1987)
- Royal Chicano Air Force (RCAF) (1972)
- Mujeres Muralistas (1973–1977)
- Con Safos and Los Quemados
- Los Four (1973–1983)
- Co-Madres Artistas (1992)

=== Museums and galleries featuring Chicano art ===
- Galería de la Raza in San Francisco, California
- Mexic-Arte Museum in Austin, Texas
- Movimiento de Arte y Cultura Latino Americana (MACLA) in San Jose, California
- Museo Eduardo Carrillo an online museum
- Cheech Marin Center for Chicano Arts and Culture in Riverside, California
- Nepantla Cultural Arts Gallery in Seattle, Washington State

== Quotes ==
"Chicano art is the modern, ongoing expression of the long-term cultural, economic, and political struggle of the Mexicano people within the United States. It is an affirmation of the complex identity and vitality of the Chicano People. Chicano art arises from and is shaped by our experiences in the Americas."—Founding Statement of the CARA National Advisory Committee, July 1987

"Arte Chicano has frequently been stereotyped as being extremely political. True enough, some of it does reflect the socio-political struggle of Chicanos, but that is not exclusively what it deals with or is about. It is not the artistic arm of any particular political ideology. It is the art of a people, of Chicanos as a cultural entity."—Los Quemados, 1975

== See also ==
- Chicana Art
- Chicana Feminism
- Nepantla
- Queer Chicano art
