= Mat Gleason =

American author

Mat Gleason (born October, 1964) is an American-born author and curator.

Gleason became known through Coagula Art Journal which he founded in 1992, and later via its brick and mortar continuation as Coagula Curatorial.

== Coagula Art Journal ==
Coagula Art Journal was founded in 1992 by Mat Gleason after finishing his education at California State University Los Angeles. Gleason used the proceeds of a winning 1992 Super Bowl bet to create a punk zine for the art world.

Employing tabloid-style commentary, gossip, and reviews of the contemporary art world, Coagula and Gleason garnered significant influence, leading to citations in other major publications. The New York Times, calling Gleason a "famously provocative local art critic," cited his opinion on popular street sculptures as " 'garbage on the streets' that reminded him of 'a kid's finger-painting class.'"

Originally a freely distributed contemporary art magazine, articles collected are now in two anthologies, Most Art Sucks and The Century Hit Puberty: Selected Essays 2010-2014. David Bowie, a subscriber to Coagula Art Journal, wrote a review of Most Art Sucks, Coagula's 1998 anthology, summing up the project as, “Cruel, insensitive and thoroughly enjoyable!” The magazine's 113th, issue published in 2016, celebrated 160 women artists, curators, and collectors.

== Coagula Curatorial ==
In April 2012, Gleason launched Coagula Curatorial, on Chinatown's historic Chung King Road; the gallery closed in 2019. Following the same rebellious, controversial spirit as the magazine, Coagula Curatorial presented solo shows by contemporary artists such as Abel Alejandre, Karen Finley, Kim Dingle, Gronk, Llyn Foulkes, Sheree Rose, and others. The gallery also utilized guest curators, who have included other prominent artists in Coagula exhibitions such as: John Fleck, Gajin Fujita, Diane Gamboa, Rafael Reyes, Peter Shelton, and others.

== Film and television ==
Gleason has appeared as commentator in film and television programs about art and Los Angeles for two decades, discussing subjects such as the American Hotel, Llyn Foulkes, Paul Paiement, Robert Williams, and censorship in film. He discussed the paintings of former President George Bush on CNN.

Gleason was a judge for seasons on the RuPaul hosted body paint competition show, Skin Wars: Fresh Paint.

== Books and articles ==
Gleason is the author and co-author of numerous books on art, including most recently Robert Williams: Father of Exponential Imagination.

== RevHaloFan and Josh Hamilton controversy ==
Gleason led SB Nation's Los Angeles Angels blog Halos Heaven beginning in 2005 using the pen name Rev Halofan. He was fired in 2015 for writing a blog post about Josh Hamilton, a player on the Texas Rangers and formerly of the Angels, who had recently admitted to a drug and alcohol relapse that prompted an MLB investigation. SB Nation removed the blog post and parted ways with Gleason, saying that the post "crossed the line between fanaticism and good taste."

== Personal life ==
Gleason is married to artist Leigh Salgado.
