= Coagula Curatorial =

Contemporary art gallery in Los Angeles, California

Coordinates: 34.066617°N 118.238092°W

Coagula Curatorial is a contemporary art gallery founded in April 2012 by Mat Gleason, Los Angeles art critic & curator. From 1992-2011, Gleason published Coagula Art Journal, a free zine-style publication on contemporary art, which gained notoriety for its "no holds barred" critique of the contemporary art world.

Following the same spirit as the magazine, the gallery opened on Los Angeles' historic Chung King Road and has hosted solo shows by contemporary artists such as Karen Finley, Kim Dingle, Gronk, Llyn Foulkes, Sheree Rose and others. The gallery also utilizes guest curators, who have included other prominent artists in Coagula exhibitions such as: John Fleck, Diane Gamboa, Germs, Peter Shelton, Gajin Fujita, Sue de Beer, Rafael Reyes and others.

Coagula Curatorial's inaugural exhibit in April 2012 for artist Tim Youd garnered press for being "sexually explicit".

In July 2012, legendary performance artist Karen Finley performed her first Los Angeles performance in 14 years at the gallery.

In October 2012, TimeOut LA called Coagula Curatorial one of LA's "Most Stylish Galleries".

In December 2013, artist Kim Dingle was quoted by the Los Angeles Times as calling Coagula Curatorial "edgy" and "free", as well as describing gallerist Mat Gleason as "an artist's gallerist".

== Exhibited Artists ==
- Tim Youd
- Gronk (artist)
- Sheree Rose
- Llyn Foulkes
- Karen Finley
- Abel Alejandre
- Matjames Metson
- Jonmarc Edwards
- Mark Dutcher
- Kim Dingle
- Alyson Souza
- Leigh Salgado
- Vito Lorusso
- Walpa D'Mark
- Tatiana Luboviski-Acosta
- Michael Montfort
- Laura London
- Carlos Batts
