= Coagula Art Journal =

Contemporary art magazine

Coagula Art Journal was founded in 1992 by Mat Gleason as a freely distributed contemporary art magazine. Since its inception, the publication remains free as a PDF download, however readers may still obtain a hard copy via "print on demand".

The bi-coastal publication employs tabloid-style commentary, gossip, and reviews of the contemporary art world, which garnered significant influence in being cited in other major publications.

The magazine has been referred to as "the publication that the art world loves to hate, and loves to read" (Village Voice) and dubbed "The National Enquirer of the Art World" (New York Post). It has also been described as having "nothing constructive about it and arguably hurtful."

In 1998, Smart Art Press released Most Art Sucks: Five Years of Coagula.

In 1999, Coagula selected Karen Finley as Artist Of The Decade.

On March 16, 2001, Coagula won a free speech lawsuit, brought against the publication by Brooklyn resident Ms. Sheh Zand. Sheh's 1992 lawsuit was over articles appearing in Coagula issues #3 and #4, and was covered by New York Magazine., and the Boston Globe.

In February 2011, Mat Gleason, founder of Coagula Art Journal, was interviewed by art critic Brian Sherwin for FineArtViews. Gleason stated that Coagula Art Journal was deeply influenced by the writing style of punk zines. He mentioned that Coagula Art Journal will eventually explore internet radio with the launch of CoaguL.A.radio which will provide coverage of the art world. Gleason also stated that “print is dead” and that future releases of Coagula Art Journal will come in the form of a book rather than of a traditional magazine. The interview between Gleason and Sherwin was featured by the Huffington Post.

In April 2012, Gleason launched Coagula Curatorial, a contemporary art gallery on Chinatown's historic Chung King Road. Following the same spirit as the magazine, the gallery has hosted solo shows by contemporary artists such as Karen Finley, Kim Dingle, Gronk, Llyn Foulkes, Sheree Rose and others. The gallery also utilizes guest curators, who have included other prominent artists in Coagula exhibitions such as: John Fleck, Diane Gamboa, Germs, Peter Shelton, Gajin Fujita, Sue de Beer, and others.

The 113th issue of Coagula Art Journal, May 2016, is the largest ever printed in the magazine’s 24 year history at 88 pages. This issue highlights Eric Minh Swenson's documentary photographs of Art Stars – 160 women artists, dealers, and writers in the art scene from New York to California – with an introduction by Mat Gleason.

== Contributors (past and present) ==
- Alan Bamberger
- Jim Caron
- Charlie Finch
- Jeff Gillette
- Mat Gleason
- Gordy Grundy
- Bryan Styble
- Tulsa Kinney

== Covers ==
Coagula has featured interviews and cover stories of such notable artists as Dan Graham, Ad Reinhardt, Gilbert & George, Matthew Barney, Richard Serra, Sue Coe, John Baldessari, Cindy Sherman, and Larry Clark.

Issue	Date	Artist/Cover Story
1	April 1992	Conservative Attacks on Art
2	July 1992	Los Angeles Riots
3	August 1992	Chicago Art Expo
4	October 1992	"NYC: Desperation Row"
5	Winter 1993	The Secret Life of Peter Halley
6	April 1993	Zand vs. Nye
7	Summer, 1993	Clinton to Arts: Drop Dead
8	Autumn, 1993	Censorship of Filipino Art
9	October, 1993	Dennis Hollingsworth
10	December, 1993	Gilbert & George
11	January 1994	Muranushi/Lederman
12	March 1994	Roy Lichtenstein
13	Summer 1994	Peter Plagens
14	September, 1994	Bob Flanagan
15	November, 1994	Lisa Adams
16	February, 1995	O.J. Simpson
17	Spring, 1995	MOMA Curator, Robert Storr
18	September, 1995	Claes Oldenburg
19	November, 1995	MOCA's Temporary Contemporary
20	January, 1996	Andy Warhol
21	April, 1996	Lari Pittman
22	Summer, 1996	Judy Chicago
23	September, 1996	Jean-Michel Basquiat
24	November, 1996	Karen Finley
25	January, 1997	Jean Baudrillard
26	March, 1997	Carolee Schneemann
27	May, 1997	Larry Gagosian
28	Summer 1997	Pat Hearn
29	October 1997	Robert Rauschenberg
30	December 1997	Manuel Ocampo
31	January 1998	Cindy Sherman
32	April 1998	John Baldessari
33	May 1998	Chris Kraus
34	September 1998	Mary Corse
35	October, 1998	John Fleck
36	November, 1998	Richard Serra
37	January, 1999	"Happy New Year, Art World"
38	March, 1999	Karen Finley (Artist Of The Decade)
39	May, 1999	Sue Coe
40	Summer, 1999	MASS MOCA's Joe Thompson
41	September, 1999	Steve Hurd
42	November, 1999	Barbara Kruger
43	December, 1999	Lynn Foulkes
44	March, 2000	Yolande Macias Mckay
45	May, 2000	Matthew Barney
46	Summer, 2000	Lars Nittve
47	September, 2000	Robert Smithson
48	November, 2000	Rick Robinson
49	January, 2001	Paul McCarthy
50	March, 2001	Sandow Birk
51	May, 2001	Roberta Smith
52	Summer, 2001	Larry Clark
53	September, 2001	Dave Hickey
54	November, 2001	"9/11: Is Art Dead?"
55	February, 2002	Carlee Fernandez
56	April, 2002	Daniel J. Martinez
57	June, 2002	Julian Schnabel
58	September, 2002	Richard Ankrom
59	November, 2002	"Iraqi Art"
60	December, 2002	"Les Damoiselles D' Washington"
61	March, 2003	Cecily Brown
62	May, 2003	Matthew Barney/Björk
63	July, 2003	"How To Resuscitate Your Art Career"
64	September, 2003	Frank Gehry
65	November, 2003	Ad Reinhardt
66	January, 2004	Michael Jackson
67	March, 2004	Viggo Mortensen
68	May, 2004	Thomas Kinkade
69	August, 2004	Nancy Reagan
70	October, 2004	Gary Baseman
71	December, 2004	Christian Ristow
72	February, 2005	Ed Ruscha
73	March, 2005	Chris Burden
74	May, 2005	Shag
75	July, 2005	Buster Friendly
76	September, 2005	The Art Of Podcasting
77	November, 2005	Liz McGrath
78	February, 2006	John Waters
79	April, 2006	Richard Tuttle
80	June, 2006	Lauren Bon
81	August, 2006	Kent Twitchell
82	September, 2006	The Art Of Poker
83	November, 2006	Bansky
84	February, 2007	Leonard Nimoy
85	April, 2007	Art & Celebrities
86	June, 2007	Mark Ryden
87	August, 2007	The Art Of Money
88	October, 2007	Chinatown: 10 year Anniversary
89	December, 2007	Ron English
90	February, 2008	8 Artists Under 28
91	March, 2008	Scoli Acosta
92	May, 2008	David Trulli
93	September 2008	Kent Twitchell Legal Victory
94	October 2008	Bernini at the Getty
95	December 2008	Obama Wins
96	February 2009	Asad Faulwell
97	April 2009	Dan Graham
98	June 2009	Finishing School
99	August 2009	Clayton Brothers
100	November 2009	History of Coagula
101	January 2010	Dawn Kasper
