= Brian Sherwin =

American art critic, writer, and blogger

Brian Sherwin (born January 22, 1980) is an American art critic, writer, and blogger with a degree from Illinois College in 2003. Sherwin is a founding Management Team member of the artist social networking site myartspace, where he also served as Senior Editor for six years. As Senior Editor for myartspace.com Sherwin established an extensive interview series with emerging and established visual artists. Sherwin currently writes for FineArtViews and is the editor of The Art Edge. Sherwin is also an advocate for youth art education.

== Life and work ==
Brian Sherwin was the Senior Editor for myartspace and continues to be an advocate for emerging artists. His interview series for myartspace was titled Art Space Talk and was included in the myartspace Weekly Featured Art Edition. The Weekly was an 'opt-in' only publication sent to subscribers by email, and can be found archived on the site. Since 2006, Sherwin has interviewed over 500 emerging and established artists and has conducted up to 30 interviews per month. Sherwin said, "I consider myself to be one of the few authentic neutral voices at this time as far as reporting what is really going on in the art world instead of being told what I should report on and when. Neutral with a bite."

The Stuckism web site said:

Brian Sherwin is the senior editor on the myartspace site, with a widespread reputation for his extensive and non-partisan interview series with over 400 artists. This is unique in its scope in contemporary art writing, encompassing world famous names such as James Rosenquist, as well as relatively unknown artists whom he considers of worth. In total it constitutes an invaluable record of contemporary art, as seen through the words of its practitioners.

Sherwin's "Art Space Talk" series of interviews involves his conversations with representatives from the business side of the art world. He has interviewed several editors and publishers from the mainstream art community. Including, Amir Fallah (Beautiful/Decay Magazine), Steven Zevitas (New American Paintings), Mark Staff Brandl (Art in America) and David Lee (Art Review, The Jackdaw). His typical questions involve topics such as the state of the art world, the validity of contemporary art fairs, and other topics related to the professional art world when interviewing art magazine editors, publishers, curators, and art critics.

Sherwin's interviews and articles explore the academic community. He often asks interviewees about their art school backgrounds, influential instructors that they have had, and suggestions for current art students. His interviews were mentioned in the May 16 and July 19, 2008, editions of the San Francisco Art Institute newsletter "SFAI/INFORM" which is archived SFAI website. His interviews with SFAI alumni Seth Lower and Christian Schumann included topics focused on the SFAI program and advice for future students. Sherwin's interview with Schumann was also featured on the Juxtapoz website.

Sherwin's on-going interview series, which has continued on FineArtViews, serves to document aspects of contemporary art culture. He bridges the mainstream art scene and the underground art scene in his interviews. He has interviewed mainstream artists, Michael Craig-Martin, Vito Acconci, James Rosenquist, Sylvia Sleigh, Georgina Starr, Patrick Brill, William T. Wiley, Norman Carlberg, Bo Bartlett, Janet Biggs, Pat Lipsky, Sarah Maple and Aleksandra Mir, artists associated with the underground art scene, Alex Grey, Blaine Fontana, Chet Zar, Mark Ryden, Laurie Lipton, David Stoupakis and Sas Christian, and members of alternative contemporary art movements, Defastenism and Stuckism. for myartspace.

For FineArtViews Sherwin has interviewed art organizers such as Rick DeVos of ArtPrize and CJ Follini of COMPANY, and artists such as Blek le Rat on topics ranging from online art marketing to issues over copyright infringement.

Sherwin has also interviewed authors and musicians. Including, his interview with bassist Sean Yseult of White Zombie, author Janet Evanovich, and author Anne Bishop.

Sherwin is also an artist. He lives in Illinois, USA, and campaigns for more prominence for art.

== Notable discourse ==
In 2007, Sherwin interviewed Kirsten Anderson, who owns the Roq la Rue Gallery, Seattle. Anderson is the author of Pop Surrealism: The Rise of Underground Art. In her interview with Sherwin she discussed the relationship between Street art, Pop surrealism and Lowbrow, as well as the growth of Juxtapoz magazine, which she thought had "morphed itself into a street art magazine.". The exchange between Sherwin and Anderson has been referenced on several online communities and forums.

In 2009, Sherwin interviewed Wikipedia co-founder Jimmy Wales. The interview focused on what passes for notability in respect to visual artist bios on Wikipedia among other things. In the course of the interview Sherwin questioned Wales about widespread allegations that Wikipedia has failed to offer adequate art coverage. Wales stressed that he feels that coverage of the arts on Wikipedia needs to be improved and admitted that there are "gaps in coverage". He told Sherwin about some of the difficulties that arise when establishing notability and stated, "We're able to find "notability" in lots of different places and for lots of different reasons."

When Sherwin pressed Wales about his interpretation of what makes a visual artist notable by Wikipedia standards Wales replied that there are "no easy answers". Wales later stated that he agreed with art critic Jerry Saltz that some Wikipedia artist entries are "bogus" while others are the "best". Wales informed Sherwin that his greatest hope is that Wikipedia "in some small ways" can help the public to appreciate art and art education. In the course of the interview Wales suggested that the art community should welcome the Wikipedia community stating that the Wikipedia project will help "bring art to everyone in a way that will drive interest in sustaining and protecting art in the long run."

In 2011 Sherwin had a follow-up in a second interview with Wales and other Wikimedia Foundation staff for Faso.com's FineArtViews blog. Wales offered thoughts about the various art focused projects on Wikipedia and some of the controversy surrounding Wikipedia articles about art. Liam Wyatt of the Wikimedia Foundation stated, "I would argue that, more than any other subject area, Art is so diverse there is no way that we could have hard/fast rules about what makes an artist notable." when asked about the difficulty of deciding if an artist is notable or not. When asked if Wikipedia staff help to create art related articles Jay Walsh responded with, "The Foundation itself is not engaged in the creation of new articles, nor partnerships with art galleries. Typically these are initiatives undertaken by volunteers or chapters of volunteers directly.".

In 2011, Sherwin interviewed art critic Mat Gleason of Coagula Art Journal for Faso.com's FineArtViews blog. Sherwin described Gleason as being a "bare-knuckled art critic". The interview between Sherwin and Gleason focused on contemporary art criticism and the role of art blog’s in present day art criticism among other issues. Gleason suggested to Sherwin that art blogs and the development of new media have become a "blow" to traditional print art magazines. Gleason and Sherwin also discussed how art bloggers form a "pack mentality" based on region and perceived significance.

== Publications and blogs ==
Sherwin is a reviewer and a contributing writer for Hi Fructose Magazine. Sherwin's articles for "Hi Fructose" document topics involving the underground and counter culture art scene. His articles include a review of Insect Lab, a series of controversial cybernetic sculptures by Mike Libby that involve insects and mechanics. Sherwin also covered the Kokeshi Project, a series of shows organized by Christina Conway, that involve Kokeshi figurines painted by 74 artists representing 13 countries. In the article Sherwin pinned the name "Culture Kokeshi" when describing the international and contemporary appeal of the figurines displayed in the Kokeshi Project compared to the territorial roots of traditional Kokeshi designs. His work has also been published in Professional Artist (magazine).

Several of Sherwin's interviews and articles have been featured content on the "Juxtapoz Art & Culture Magazine" website. This includes his interviews with Christian Schumann, Anthony Lister, and Alex Grey. He has also been a guest interviewer and referenced on underground art sites the beinArt Surreal Artist Collective, and Underground Art Union Sherwin's interview with Michael Craig-Martin was cited at length in a Deutsche Bank Art Mag feature about the artist. His FineArtViews interview with art critic Mat Gleason was featured on The Huffington Post.

== Criticism ==
Sherwin was critical of the street artist Shepard Fairey due to copyright infringement allegations involving Fairey's Obama posters and Obey clothing line. Sherwin defended the criticism of Mark Vallen, an artis who claimed that Fairey's career has been based on plagiarism and appropriation without attribution. and the Milwaukee Journal Sentinel website. Sherwin's criticism of Shepard Fairey has appeared on Maynard Institute for Journalism Education articles. Nick Rizzuto on the Conservative Punk web site said that Sherwin "makes a pretty good case".

Sherwin was also critical of Joy Garnett, Richard Prince and other artists suspected of copyright infringement who support free culture and limited copyright protection. Sherwin supported Brad Holland, co-founder of The Illustrators Partnership of America, who is in favor of creative copyrights on intellectual property.
