= Julian Stanczak =

Polish-born American painter

- Julian Stanczak at his home in Ohio (2013)
- Born: November 5, 1928; Borownica, Second Polish Republic
- Died: March 25, 2017 (aged 88); Seven Hills, Ohio, United States
- Education: Cleveland Institute of Art; Yale University
- Occupation: Painter
- Movement: Op art, geometric abstraction
- Spouse: Barbara Stanczak

Julian Stanczak (Polish: Stańczak [ˈstaɲt͡ʂak]; November 5, 1928 – March 25, 2017) was a Polish-born American painter and printmaker whose investigations of color and visual perception made him an important figure in post war geometric abstraction. He is considered a central figure of the Op art movement that came of age in the 1960s and 1970s. Described as an artist whose work "evinced a tremendous geometric inventiveness" and one who “produced some of the most emotionally gripping paintings associated with [Op art]", Stanczak is primarily known for his large-scale polychromatic abstract compositions made using acrylic paint on canvas in which he explored the perceptual dimensions of color.

Born in 1928 in Borownica, Poland, Stanczak survived a Siberian labor camp during World War II where he permanently lost the use of his right arm. While in a Polish refugee camp in Uganda, Africa, he retrained himself to paint left-handed. He emigrated to London in 1948 and from there to the United States in 1950, where he eventually became a citizen. In 1956, Stanczak received an M.F.A. from Yale University, where he studied with Josef Albers and Conrad Marca-Relli, and was roommates with fellow abstract painter Richard Anuszkiewicz. The term "Op art", originated from Stanczak's work when the Minimalist artist and sculptor Donald Judd used it in his critical review of the 1964 exhibition titled Julian Stanczak: Optical Paintings at the Martha Jackson Gallery in New York. Stanczak achieved broader commercial recognition after being featured in the landmark 1965 exhibition The Responsive Eye created by curator William C. Seitz at the Museum of Modern Art in New York.

For more than six decades, Stanczak remained active as a painter and continued to exhibit his work in museum and gallery exhibitions in the U.S. and Europe. In addition to being a practicing artist, Stanczak served as a faculty member at the Art Academy of Cincinnati from 1957 to 1964 and, later, as Professor of Painting at the Cleveland Institute of Art from 1964 to 1995. In 2013, he was awarded an honorary doctorate from Case Western Reserve University in Ohio. Stanczak lived and worked in Seven Hills, Ohio with his wife, the sculptor Barbara Stanczak, until his death in 2017. His work is included in the permanent collections of more than 100 museums.

== Early life and work ==
=== Early life and education (1928-1950) ===
Julian Stanczak (left) photographed with his younger brother Marian (right) and the artist Richard Anuszkiewicz (center) at Yale University in 1956

Julian Stanczak (Polish: Stańczak) was born in Borownica, Poland in 1928. In 1940, at the beginning of World War II, Stanczak and his family were forced into a Soviet labor camp in Perm, Siberia, where his right arm is seriously injured; he had been right-handed. In 1942, Stanczak together with his family successfully escaped from the camp. Aged sixteen, Stanczak decided to join the Polish Armed Forces in the West to receive food rations and medical help, becoming separated from his parents, sister, and brother. Realizing that he would permanently lose use of his right arm, Stanczak deserted.

He then traveled to a refugee camp in Tehran where he joined his mother and siblings; his father had by that time gone missing. The family was then transported to a Polish refugee camp in Masindi, British Uganda. Stanczak remained there for six years. He received his first art lessons during that period from another Polish refugee named Henryk Frudist. Stanczak would later state that the time in Uganda had an important visual and artistic influence on his work; in particular, he found inspiration in geometric patterns of local textiles used by Ugandan women to make clothing, indigenous music, and East African fauna and flora, which he described as "dazzling display". In 1948, Stanczak and his family moved to England where he enrolled at the Borough Polytechnic to study art.

=== Immigration to the United States (1950) ===
Evening Walk in a Foreign Country, 1958

The Stanczaks eventually immigrated to the United States in 1950 and permanently relocated to Cleveland, Ohio, where Stanczak would spend the rest of his life and career. Stanczak received his Bachelor of Fine Arts degree from the Cleveland Institute of Art, Cleveland Ohio in 1954, and then trained under Josef Albers and Conrad Marca-Relli at the Yale University, where he was roommates with Richard Anuszkiewicz who would later become one of the key artists associated with Op Art. Stanczak was a student of Albers for two years and was awarded a Master of Fine Arts from Yale University in 1956.

Albers, who had formerly served as a faculty member at the Bauhaus and taught classes in color theory, served as an important influence for Stanczak and his "work modeled the perceptual practices" of Stanczak. According to the American scholar Joe Houston, the investigation of color became the primary interest of Stanczak and Anuszkiewicz while at Yale. In particular, Stanczak was inspired by the 1954 book by Rudolf Arnheim, a German Gestalt theorist with strong connections to the Bauhaus, titled Perception: A Psychology of the Creative Eye, which the artist translated into Polish. Writing in 1992, the Artforum critic Elizabeth Licata said that Stanczak's precise linear systems operate within the visual rigor and limits set out by Albers who, according to Stanczak, "taught by confrontation anxiety". In 1955, Stanczak's paintings of "an abstracted linear pattern" were included in an annual exhibition of new art at the Cleveland Museum of Art, where he was awarded an honorary mention. He became a United States citizen in 1957 and taught at the Art Academy of Cincinnati for 7 years.

== Career in the U.S. ==
=== Op-art movement (1964-1970s) ===
The term op art was first coined by the American Minimalist artist Donald Judd in a review for Arts Magazine of Julian Stanczak: Optical Paintings held at the Martha Jackson Gallery in New York in 1964. Judd described his paintings as "primarily fields of narrow, vibrating stripes" and compared them to the work of the British artist Bridget Riley before stating that optical effects "are one thing, a narrow phenomenon, and color effects are another, a wide range. Op art". Critic Burton Wasserman would later describe the exhibition as a "demonstration of lean plastic purity". In 1965, Stanczak's work was included in the Museum of Modern Art's landmark exhibition The Responsive Eye curated by William C. Seitz. Although the show was poorly received by the critics, it proved popular with the general public and helped establish Op art as a distinct art movement, while many participating artists received substantial market recognition. According to art critic Christopher Bedford, "the egalitarian address of Op art to our basic optical faculties serves Stanczak well, making his paintings as generous conceptually as they are experientially demanding". Stanczak, however, preferred to call his style "perceptual art" rather than "optical".

In 1966 he was named a "New Talent" by Art in America magazine. In 1973, Stanczak designed a mural for a 12-story residential building in Cleveland called Carter Manor, which would subsequently become badly damaged due to the contractor's decision to use enamel paint. The mural was eventually restored in 2018 by artists participating in that year's FRONT Triennial exhibition in Cleveland. As the popularity of Op art began to diminish in the late 1970s, superseded by such movements as Minimalism and later Postminimalism, Stanczak's work became progressively separated from mainstream American art. He continued to exhibit frequently until the end of his life, primarily in the Midwest. Some critics have noted that Stanczak's medium of acrylic paint and his visual vocabulary had remained largely unchanged since the 1960s, consisting primarily of parallel lines, straight or curved, various grids, and basic geometric shapes such as circles or squares.

Belated Echo, 1965, acrylic on canvas, 53 x 53 in.

Chromatic Fold, Acra Yellow, 1970, acrylic on canvas

=== Later career (1980s-2017) ===
During the early 1990s, Stanczak work was said to have influenced a new generation of artists including Peter Halley and Philip Taaffe. In addition to being an artist, Stanczak was also a teacher, having worked at the Art Academy of Cincinnati from 1957 to 1964 and as Professor of Painting, at the Cleveland Institute of Art, 1964-1995. He was named "Outstanding American Educator" by the Educators of America in 1970. He collaborated with other Polish-American artists, including Hanna Zawa-Cywińska.

In 2007, Stanczak was interviewed by Brian Sherwin for Myartspace Blog. During the interview, Stanczak recalled his experiences with war and the loss of his right arm and how both influenced his art. Stanczak explained: "The transition from using my left hand as my right, main hand, was very difficult. My youthful experiences with the atrocities of the Second World War are with me, but I wanted to forget them and live a 'normal' life and adapt into society more fully. In the search for art, you have to separate what is emotional and what is logical. (...) I looked for anonymity of actions through non-referential, abstract art". In 2008, Stanczak designed a 364-foot mural made of painted metal rods for the exterior of a corporate building in downtown Cincinnati. In 2013, Stanczak was awarded an honorary doctorate from Case Western Reserve University in Cleveland, Ohio. For most of his life, he lived and worked in Seven Hills, Ohio with his wife, sculptor Barbara Stanczak. He died at home on March 25, 2017 at the age of 88 following a short illness.

== Select museum collections ==
Julian Stanczak's works are held in permanent collections of museums in North America, Central and South America, and Europe. These include:

- Albright-Knox Art Gallery, Buffalo, New York
- Art Gallery of Ontario, Toronto, Canada
- Brooklyn Museum, Brooklyn, New York
- Cleveland Institute of Art, Cleveland, Ohio
- Cleveland Museum of Art, Cleveland, Ohio
- Crystal Bridges Museum of American Art, Bentonville, Arkansas
- Dallas Museum of Art, Dallas, Texas
- Hirshhorn Museum and Sculpture Garden, Smithsonian Institution, Washington, DC
- Los Angeles County Museum of Art, Los Angeles, California
- Metropolitan Museum of Art, New York, NY
- Museo de Arte Contemporaneo de Buenos Aires, Buenos Aires, Argentina
- Museo Rufino Tamayo, Museo de Arte Contemporaneo, Mexico City, Mexico
- Museum of Fine Arts, Houston, Texas
- Museum of Modern Art, New York, New York
- National Gallery of Art, Smithsonian Institution, Washington, DC
- New Orleans Museum of Art, New Orleans, Louisiana
- Philadelphia Museum of Art, Philadelphia, Pennsylvania
- San Francisco Museum of Modern Art, San Francisco, California

== Bibliography ==
- Arnheim, Rudolf, Harry Rand and Robert Bertholf. Julian Stanczak: Decades of Light (University of Buffalo, Poetry and Rare Book Collection, 1990)
- McClelland, Elizabeth. Julian Stanczak, Retrospective: 1948-1998 (Butler Institute of American Art, 1998)
- Serigraphs and Drawings of Julian Stanczak 1970-1972 (exh. cat. by Gene Baro, Corcoran Gallery of Art, 1972)
- Julian Stanczak: Color = Form (exh. cat. by Jacqueline Shinners and Rudolf Arnheim, Dennos Museum Center, Northwestern Michigan College, 1993)
