= Martha Ronk =

American poet (born 1940)

Martha Clare Ronk (born 1940 Cleveland, Ohio) is an American poet.

== Life ==
She graduated from Wellesley College, and Yale University with a B.A. and Ph.D. She taught at the University of Colorado and Otis College of Art and Design, and Naropa University Summer Writing Program. and Occidental College. She joined the Occidental faculty in 1981 and retired as a professor of English and Comparative Literary Studies in 2014.

She has lived in Los Angeles since 1971.

== Awards ==
- 2006 National Poetry Series
- 2005 PEN USA award in poetry
- Lynda Hull Poetry Award
- 2002 The Denver Quarterly
- Artist Residencies at the MacDowell Colony and Djerassi
- MacArthur summer Research Grant
- Mary Elvira Stevens Traveling Fellowship from Wellesley College
- Gertrude Stein Awards in Poetry
- NEA grant

== Works ==
=== Poetry ===
- Ocular Proof. Omnidawn Publishing. 2016. ISBN 978-1632430250
- Transfer of Qualities. Omnidawn Publishing. 2013. ISBN 978-1890650827
- "A MEMORY OF HER LODGED IN WET AIR AND SKIN"; "GETTING A HOLD"; "WHY DOES ONE DREAM OF THEM?", Jacket 13, April 2001
- "Objects". Boston Review. January–February 2009. Archived from the original on 2009-10-02.
- "In a landscape of having to repeat", Poetry Foundation
- In a Landscape of Having to Repeat. Omnidawn Publishing. 2004. ISBN 978-1-890650-17-9.
- Why/Why Not. University of California Press. 2003. ISBN 978-0-520-23811-4.
- Eyetrouble. University of Georgia Press. 1998. ISBN 978-0-8203-1992-6.
- Desert Geometries. Illustrator Don Suggs. Littoral Books. 1992. ISBN 978-1-55713-151-5.
- Recent Terrains photographer Laurie Brown, Center for American Places, Johns Hopkins Press, 2000
- Desire in LA. University of Georgia Press. 1990. ISBN 978-0-8203-1176-0.
- Vertigo, selections. Coffee House Press. 2007. ISBN 978-1-56689-205-6. chapbook
- Prepositional. Los Angeles: Mindmade Books 2004.
- Quotidian chapbook, a+bend books, 2000
- Allegories chapbook with artist Tom Wudl, ML & NLF Books, 1998 Emblems, chapbook, Instress, 1998

=== Short stories ===
- Glass Grapes: And Other Stories. BOA Editions. 2008. ISBN 978-1-934414-13-2.

=== Memoir ===
- State of Mind. Sun & Moon Books. 1995. ISBN 978-1-55713-236-9.
- Displeasures of the Table. Green Integer. 2001. ISBN 978-1-892295-44-6.

=== Ploughshares ===
- "Cameras Came Then to Replace Descriptive Paragraphs". Ploughshares. Winter 2005–2006. Archived from the original on June 9, 2007.
- "Fishes". Ploughshares. Winter 1990–1991. Archived from the original on November 4, 2007.
