= Kat Von D =

Mexican-American tattoo artist and television personality

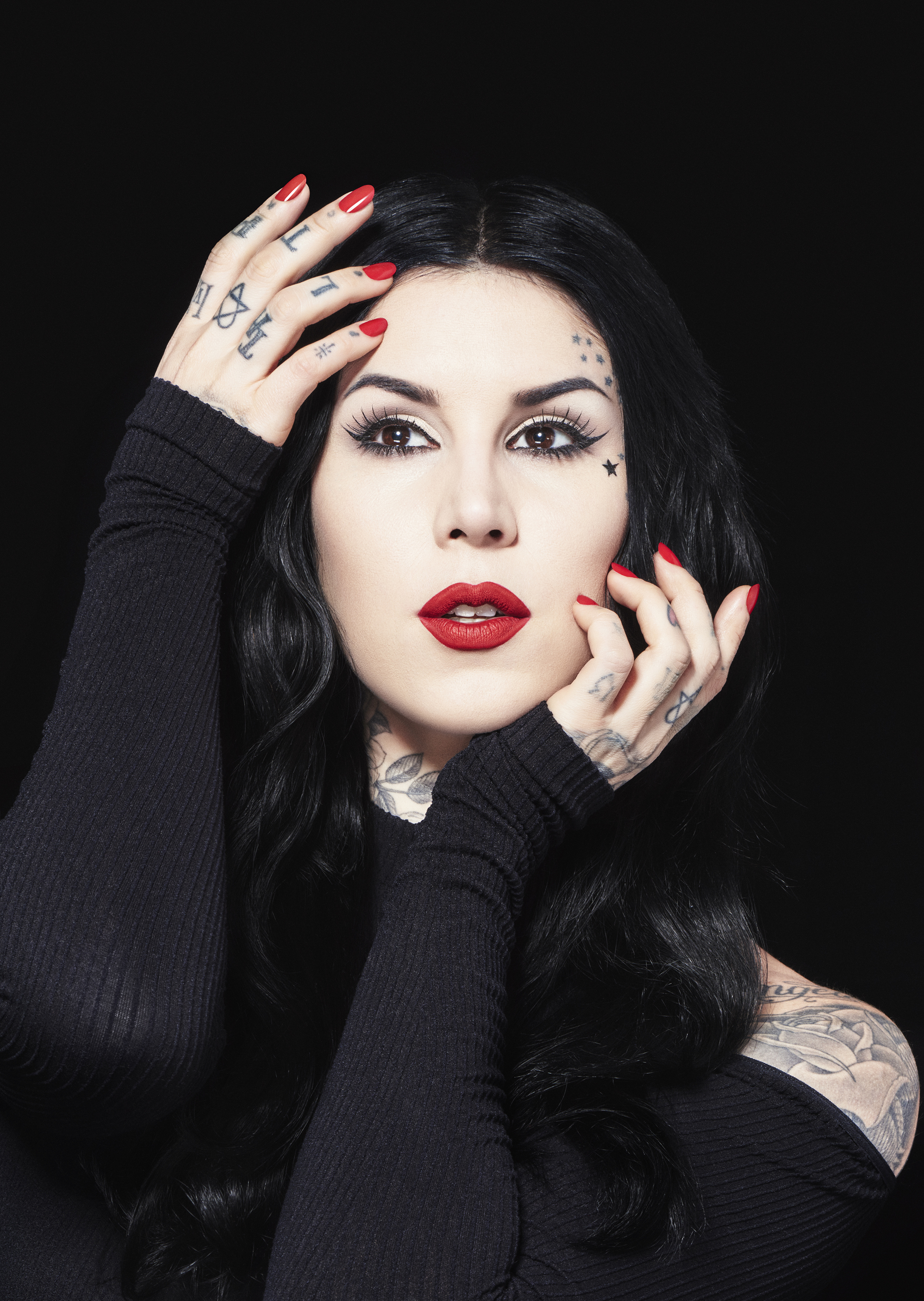
- Von D in March 2016
- Born: Katherine von Drachenberg; March 8, 1982 (age 44); Montemorelos, Nuevo León, Mexico
- Occupations: Tattoo artist; television personality; entrepreneur; recording artist
- Spouses: Oliver Peck (m. 2003; div. 2007); Rafael Reyes (m. 2018)
- Children: 1
- Website: katvond.com

Katherine von Drachenberg (born March 8, 1982), known professionally as Kat Von D, is a Mexican-born American tattoo artist, television personality, entrepreneur and recording artist. She was a tattoo artist on the TLC reality television show LA Ink, which premiered in the United States on August 7, 2007, and ran for four seasons. She is also known for being the former head of Kat Von D Beauty (renamed KVD Beauty). In May 2021, Kat Von D released her first single "Exorcism" from her debut studio album Love Made Me Do It. Her second studio album, My Side of the Mountain, was released in 2024.

== Early life ==
Katherine von Drachenberg was born on March 8, 1982, in Montemorelos, Nuevo León, Mexico. Her parents, René and Sylvia (née Galeano), both of whom were missionaries for the Seventh-day Adventist Church, were born in Argentina, and are respectively of German, Italian, Spanish, and Indigenous descent. Von D has a sister, Karoline and a brother, Michael. She moved with her family from Mexico to the United States at age four and grew up in Colton, California. Von D was classically trained in piano beginning at age six. Von D speaks Spanish and English.

Von D credits her paternal grandmother, Clara von Drachenberg, as an inspiration for her in music and art, and the culture of San Bernardino County as a major influence on her tattoo art and style. She began listening to the Ramones, Misfits, and other punk rock bands at the age of 12. She got her first tattoo at 14 and quit school at 16 to become a tattoo artist.

When she was 15, Von D was sent to Provo Canyon School for six months, a notorious facility of the troubled teen industry, where she says she suffered abuse. Provo Canyon School is the same boarding school that Paris Hilton attended; Hilton has also alleged that she was abused while attending this school.

== Career ==
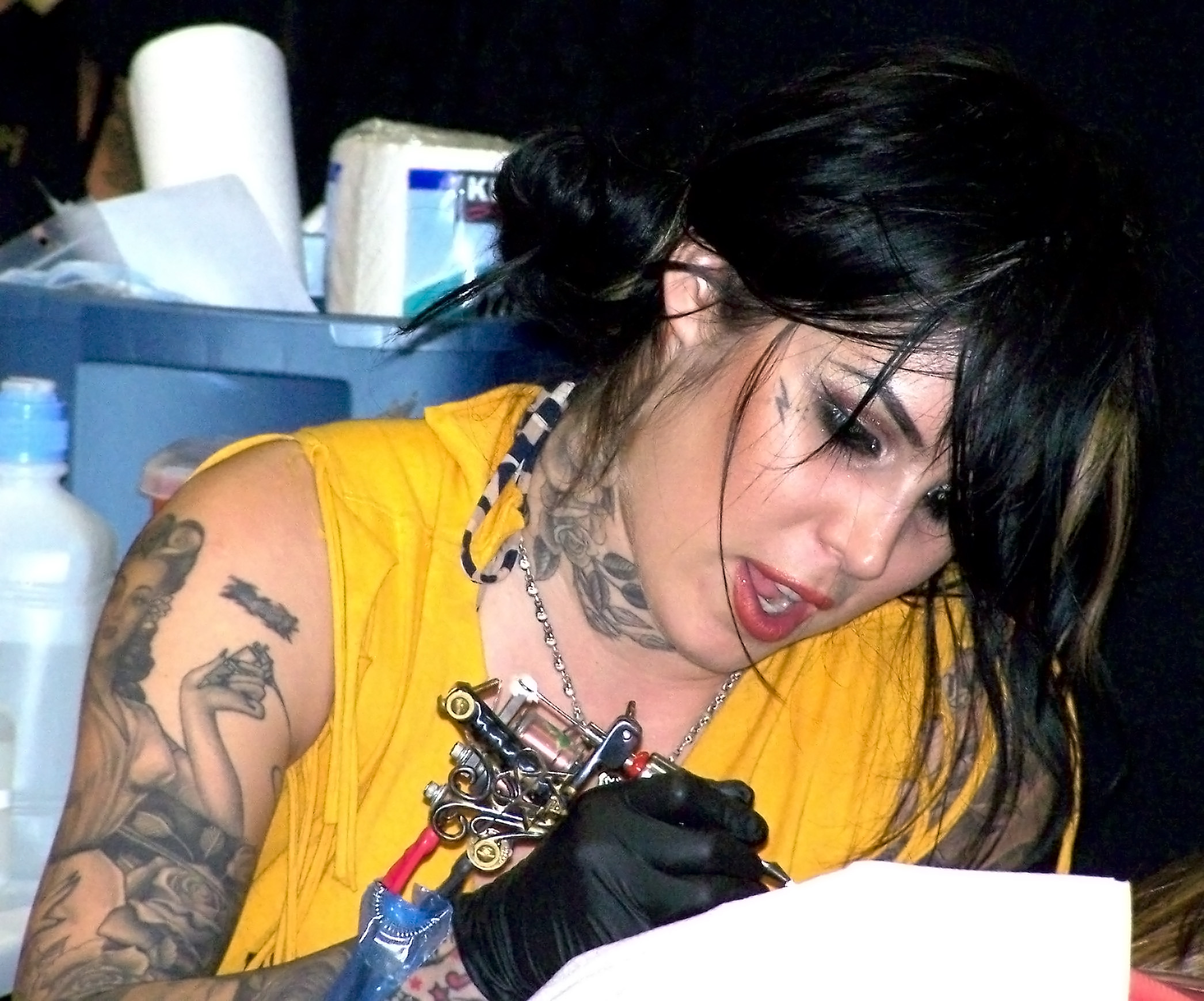
Von D at the 2007 Calgary Tattoo & Arts Festival

Von D appeared in two seasons of Miami Ink, the reality TV show taped at 305 Ink in Miami for the cable network TLC. She was offered the place on the show after fellow artist Darren Brass broke his elbow, preventing him from tattooing. While on the show, she had a falling out with Ami James, which led to her decision to leave the shop and the show.

She subsequently acquired her own TLC series, LA Ink, which chronicled her work at her tattoo shop, High Voltage Tattoo, in Hollywood, California. On the show, she broke the Guinness World Record of most tattoos given by a single person in 24 hours, with a total of 400. Accomplished in December 2007, it involved a Von D-designed logo for the city of Los Angeles, with proceeds going to the children's-blindness charity Vitamin Angels. LA Ink ran four seasons, ending September 15, 2011; TLC announced the cancellation on August 18, 2011. Von D has publicly said that the cancellation was because she chose not to continue doing the show.

Her first book, High Voltage Tattoo, compiling her artworks and tattoos, with a foreword by Mötley Crüe's Nikki Sixx, was released in January 2009 and reached #6 on The New York Times Best Seller list. Von D described the book as "not an autobiography, you know, 'cause I'm too young to do that. But this is just kind of like a picture-driven outline of my career as an artist. So, you see everything from my drawings when I was six to tattoos that have never before been seen." Her second book, The Tattoo Chronicles, an illustrated diary following a year in her life, was released October 26, 2010, and reached #3 on The New York Times "Hardcover Advice & Misc." Best Seller list.

In 2008, Von D created and launched a make-up line for Sephora. She has released new collections every year and has expanded her line to include fragrances. In 2012, through Sephora, her New American Beauty Art Tour benefitted the Art of Elysium charitable organization. In June 2016, she announced that all products in the line would be reformulated to be vegan. In August 2016, the line released a limited-edition lipstick named Project Chimps, with 20% of sales being donated to Project Chimps, an organization dedicated to providing care for retired research chimpanzees.

Von D is the creator of the MusInk Tattoo Convention and Music Festival, which began in 2008. Musink is an all ages tattoo, music, and art festival located in Southern California.

On September 2, 2010, Von D opened the art gallery and boutique called Wonderland Gallery in the space next door to High Voltage Tattoo. She launched the clothing lines KVD Los Angeles and Kat Von D Los Angeles in the US and Canada in fall 2011, with the latter expanding internationally the following year.

Von D provided the female vocals to the song "Rosary Blue" on X, a 2012 studio album by the Finnish gothic rock band The 69 Eyes. In August 2013, she tweeted that Dave Grohl and producer Danny Lohner had finished two tracks of an album she had talked about recording as early as 2011.

In 2016 she recorded vocals for the electronic music duo, Prayers, on the song "Black Leather", and appeared in the band's video for the song.

In 2018, she collaborated with Rooney Mara, Sia, Sadie Sink and Joaquin Phoenix to narrate Chris Delforce's animal rights documentary Dominion. For her contribution to the documentary, she was granted the 2018 Award of Excellence for Narration by Hollywood International Independent Documentary Awards. Von D makes guest appearance on three songs on the 2018 album Alive in New Light by IAMX. She also appeared on synthwave band Gunship album Dark All Day in the song "Black Blood, Red Kiss".

On January 16, 2020, Von D announced she had sold her namesake beauty brand to its parent company, Kendo Brands (a subsidiary of LVMH). The line rebranded as "KVD Vegan Beauty". According to the company the letters KVD stood for "Kindness, Vegan Beauty, and Discovery (and Doing Good)". This was followed by another rebrand on Tuesday 2 March 2021 to "KVD Beauty" where KVD stands for "Kara", "Veritas", "Decora". This translates to "Value", "Truth" and "Beauty" respectively.

In October 2021, she announced that she would be closing High Voltage on December 1 and moving with her family to Indiana.

By February 2022, Von D began blacking out a lot of her tattoos.

== Controversies ==
Her makeup line received controversy after the release of a lipstick called "Selektion," because the word is considered controversial and inappropriate in the word's native German, where it was a term used for Nazis who decided which individuals would be chosen to either be put to work or death upon arrival to concentration camps during World War II. The fallout led to the lipstick being renamed "Beloved". The choice of "Selektion" drew attention to other perceived insensitive acts; The Forward called her "anti-Jew." Von D fell under criticism again when she named a lipstick "Celebutard"; Sephora quickly pulled the lipstick from their stores and issued an apology.

Von D sparked controversy in June 2018, when she indicated in an Instagram post that she would refuse to vaccinate her future child and would raise her child on a vegan diet. In March 2020, she renounced her anti-vaxxer position, saying she had been "completely uninformed" about vaccinations and that she is "not an anti-vaxxer at all".

== Personal life ==
In July 2007, Von D decided to stop drinking and become sober after her usage of alcohol started to threaten her work. Von D recalled that "getting sober was not easy for me...I still clearly remember the physical pain from withdrawals, the profound desire to die, and the overwhelming sense of loneliness I felt that day that I decided to quit."

Von D has tattooed herself with the emblems of the bands HIM, Misfits, Turbonegro, ZZ Top, Guns N' Roses, AC/DC, Kent, Slayer, Mike Got Spiked and "Slutallica", a modified Metallica logo. She appeared in the music video of HIM's "Killing Loneliness", Alkaline Trio's "Help Me", Gunship's "Black Blood Red Kiss", and "Black Leather" by Cholo Goth band Prayers. Other musical artists that Von D lists among her favorites include Lemmy Kilmister, the Mars Volta and Selena.

Von D had a public friendship with internet personality and makeup artist Jeffree Star beginning in 2006. She had inked him with multiple large tattoos and had named a shade of her 'Kat Von D Everlasting Liquid Lipstick in Jeffree' after him. In July of 2016 Von D publicly ended her friendship with him, firstly in an Instagram post, citing problematic drug use, racial views, and bullying. She then elaborated via a YouTube video that the specifics of her issue with him was due to him allegedly not compensating their mutual friend and tattoo artist B.J. Betts for creative work done for Star's brand.

In March 2022, Von D moved to Vevay, Indiana to reside at the Benjamin Schenck Mansion.

By March 2023, Von D had sold her Isaac Newton Van Nuys mansion in Windsor Square, Los Angeles.

In 2024, Von D won a copyright lawsuit filed against her in 2021 by photographer Jeffrey Sedlik. Sedlik had claimed that Von D infringed on his copyright of a 1989 photograph of Miles Davis by tattooing a version of the image on a friend's arm. The jury determined that the tattoo was not sufficiently similar to Sedlik's photograph. Following the verdict, Von D stated that the legal battle had influenced her decision to stop tattooing, possibly for good.

=== Views ===
Von D is a vegan, and founded a makeup line that is vegan and cruelty-free, she announced on Instagram that in January 2020, that she had sold it to Kendo and was going to spend more time with her son, music career and vegan shoe brand. In 2016, she received Farm Sanctuary's "Compassion in Action Award" for her work on behalf of animal rights.

=== Religious beliefs ===
Von D was raised by Seventh-day Adventist missionary parents. In July 2022, she publicly announced that she was discarding her collection of books on witchcraft, magick, and the occult, stating that these practices no longer "aligned" with her and that she desired to surround her family with "love and light".

In October 2023, Von D shared a video of her baptism at the Switzerland Baptist Church in Vevay, Indiana. During an interview on the podcast Relatable with Allie Beth Stuckey, she clarified that she had transitioned to Christianity around 2019, though she had kept her faith private for several years while she "learned and grew" in her journey.

In July 2025, Von D announced that she had officially joined the Eastern Orthodox Church during the preceding Pascha (Easter). She had previously become a catechumen in the Church in 2024. She noted that she would refrain from giving detailed public interviews regarding her conversion for at least one year following her entry into the church, citing advice from her priest to focus on her spiritual integration rather than public representation.

=== Relationships ===
Von D married fellow tattoo artist Oliver Peck in 2003. They separated in August 2007, and finalized their divorce later that year.

Von D then dated Alex "Orbi" Orbison from 2007 to early 2008, as was documented on the first season of LA Ink. Von D and Orbison moved in together in the episode "Kat Cleans Up", and in the last episode of the season, titled "Orbi's Secret", Orbison asks Von D's father for permission to marry her. By the first episode of Season 2, their relationship was over.

From February 2008 until January 2010, Von D dated Mötley Crüe bassist Nikki Sixx.

She subsequently began dating Jesse James, a motorcycle customizer. On August 19, 2010, Von D confirmed media reports that she and James were dating, tweeting, "I think it's pretty obvious that we're dating." Von D and James became engaged in January 2011. Von D announced that they had split in July 2011. However, in August 2011, Von D and James announced that their engagement was back on. In September 2011, Von D announced that she and James had broken up again.

In September 2012, Von D began dating Canadian music producer Joel Zimmerman, known professionally as Deadmau5, and gave him a star tattoo below his eye to match her own. They broke up in November 2012. However, on December 15, 2012, Zimmerman proposed to Von D over Twitter, and she accepted, becoming engaged to him. In June 2013, Von D announced that she and Zimmerman had ended their engagement. Von D cited Zimmerman's alleged infidelity as the reason, which Zimmerman has denied.

On February 21, 2018, Von D married artist Rafael Reyes. In November 2018, she gave birth to their son.

== Media ==
Von D is referenced in the Eagles of Death Metal song "High Voltage", which was named after her shop and is featured on the band's third album, Heart On. In an interview, Eagles of Death Metal's Jesse Hughes said, "I wrote that for Kat Von D, because that girl's bad ass."

== Selected filmography ==
In addition to cameo and talk-show appearances, Von D's television, film, and video game appearances include:

=== Movies ===
Year	Title	Notes
2009	The Bleeding	as Vanya
2010	Lemmy	
2018	Dominion	Narration

=== TV shows ===
Year	Title	Notes
2004	Pimp My Ride	
2007	American Chopper: The Series	1 episode
2007	Bam's Unholy Union	2 episodes
2005–2007	Miami Ink	
2007–2011	LA Ink	
2008	Free Radio	1 episode
2008	MADtv	1 episode
2008	Denise Richards: It's Complicated	1 episode
2008	The Cho Show	1 episode
2008	Allez à L.A.!	
2008	I Love the New Millennium	
2008	Bam Margera Presents: Where the ♯$&% Is Santa?	
2008	Anytime with Bob Kushell	
2009	E.S.L.: Entertainment as a Second Language	
2009	Tony Hawk: Ride	Video Game; unlockable skater
2013	I Love Jenni	
2016	Life in Pieces	
2022	The Lincoln Lawyer	Poker Dealer

== Discography ==
=== Studio albums ===
Title	Details
Love Made Me Do It	Released: August 27, 2021; Label: self-released; Formats: CD, vinyl, streaming, digital download
My Side of the Mountain	Released: September 20, 2024; Label: Kartel Music Group; Formats: CD, vinyl, streaming, digital download

=== EPs ===
Title	Year
Exorcisms	Released: November 30, 2021; Label: self-released; Formats: streaming, digital download

=== Singles ===
Year	Title
2021	Exorcism
2021	I Am Nothing
2021	Enough
2021	Fear You
2022	Fotos y Recuerdos
2022	Lovesong
2023	Vampire Love

=== Other releases ===
Year	Music Title	Note
2013	Rosary Blue	The 69 Eyes feat. Kat Von D
2017	Black Leather	Prayers feat. Kat Von D
2018	Stardust	IAMX feat. Kat Von D
2018	Stalker	IAMX feat. Kat Von D
2018	The Power and the Glory	IAMX feat. Kat Von D
2019	The Boy Inside the Skeleton	Heaven Process feat. Kat Von D, Prayers
2019	Creatures (Out of Tune)	Heaven Process feat. Mark Burgess, Kat Von D, Prayers, Chelsey Boy
2019	Time Stands Stil	Heaven Process feat. Kat Von D
2019	Heaven Below (Descending)	Heaven Process feat. Kat Von D
2020	Black Blood Red Kiss	Gunship with Kat Von D
2023	This Murder Takes Two	The 69 Eyes feat Kat Von D
2025	Whispers End	Dance with the Dead feat Kat Von D
