= L.A. Louver =

Art gallery in Venice, Los Angeles, United States

Coordinates: 33°59′05″N 118°28′14″W

L.A. Louver is an art gallery focusing on American and European contemporary art. The gallery is located in Venice, Los Angeles, California, United States.

== Directors ==
The gallery directors are Peter Goulds, Kimberly Davis, and Elizabeth East. Lisa Jann is the Managing Director. The gallery is a member of the Art Dealers Association of America.

== Artists ==
Established in 1976, the gallery represents the following notable artists:

- Terry Allen
- Tony Berlant
- Tony Bevan
- Deborah Butterfield
- Rebecca Campbell
- Dale Chihuly
- Richard Deacon
- Mark di Suvero
- Gajin Fujita
- David Hockney (since 1978)
- Ben Jackel
- Leon Kossoff
- Guillermo Kuitca
- Jonathan Lasker
- Jason Martin
- Enrique Martínez Celaya
- Michael C. McMillen
- Gwynn Murrill
- Sandra Mendelsohn Rubin
- Alison Saar
- Sean Scully
- Joel Shapiro
- Peter Shelton
- Juan Uslé
- Tom Wudl

In addition, the gallery manages various artist estates, including:

- William Brice
- Charles Garabedian
- Frederick Hammersley
- Edward & Nancy Reddin Kienholz
- Per Kirkeby
- R.B. Kitaj
- Ed Moses
- Ken Price
- Don Suggs
- Fred Williams

== Design ==
The 8,000-square-foot (740 m^{2}) building that houses the gallery was designed by architect Frederick Fisher.
