= Borownica, Podkarpackie Voivodeship =

Borownica
- Village
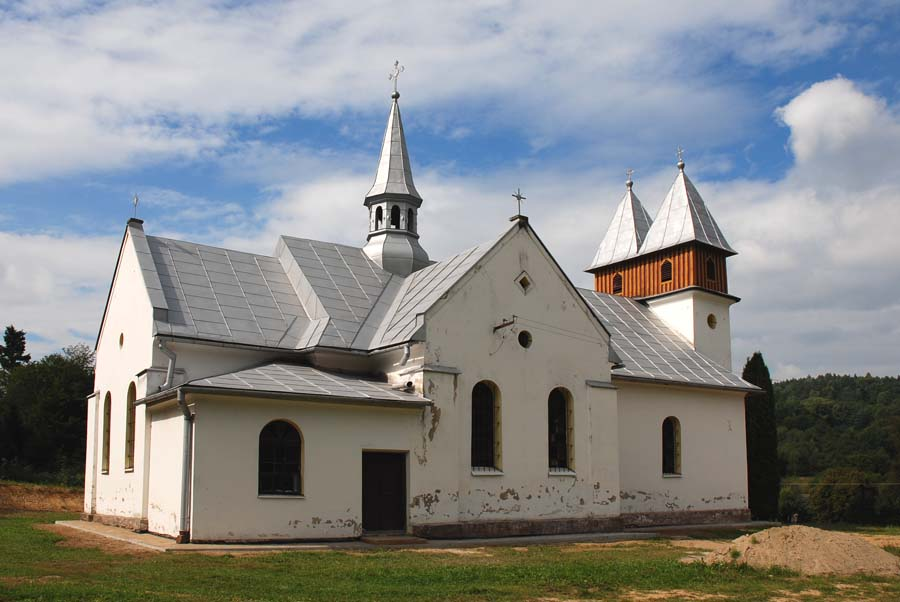
- Church in Borownica

- Location within Poland
- Coordinates: 49°42′2″N 22°18′20″E
- Country: Poland
- Voivodeship: Subcarpathian
- County: Przemyśl
- Gmina: Bircza
- Population: 110

Borownica [bɔrɔvˈnit͡sa] is a village in the administrative district of Gmina Bircza, within Przemyśl County, Subcarpathian Voivodeship, in south-eastern Poland.

Julian Stanczak was born in Borownica.
