= Hanna Zawa-Cywińska =

Contemporary Polish female artist

- Born: 1939 (age 86–87); Łomża, Poland
- Education: University of Warsaw
- Style: geometric abstraction
- Website: hannazawa-cywinska.com

Hanna Zawa-Cywińska (b. 1939) is a Polish contemporary abstract artist based in Warsaw.

== Life and work ==
Hanna Zawa-Cywińska was born in 1939 in Łomża. She studied biochemistry and journalism at the University of Warsaw in Communist Poland before defecting to the U.S. with her husband in 1967. While living and working in New York, she became one of the founding members of the short-lived Polish American Artists Society. Among other artists, she collaborated with op-art painters of Polish origin, Richard Anuszkiewicz and Julian Stanczak. Between 1994 and 2004, she lived and worked in Switzerland. Her practice has focused primarily on abstraction and has been inspired by the Polish interwar avant-garde and Constructivism, including the work of Katarzyna Kobro, Władysław Strzemiński, and Henryk Stażewski.

Zawa-Cywińska's paintings, sculptures and prints have been exhibited in solo and group exhibition at museums in the United States and Europe, including the Art Gallery of Tennessee University, Chattanooga, Springfield Art Center, Museum of Art Fort Lauderdale, the National Center for Culture in Warsaw, and Zachęta National Gallery of Art in Warsaw, among others.
