= My Side of the Mountain (album) =

2024 studio album by Kat Von D

Studio album by Kat Von D
- Released: September 20, 2024
- Genre: Alternative pop
- Length: 36:10
- Language: English; Spanish
- Label: Kartel Music Group
- Producer: Kat Von D; Fernando Garibay; Paul Mullen; Ramiro Padilla; Mr. Pharmacist

Kat Von D chronology
Love Made Me Do It (2021)	My Side of the Mountain (2024)

Singles from My Side of the Mountain
- 1. "Vampire Love" Released: October 24, 2023; 2. "Dead" Released: May 30, 2024; 3. "Illusion" Released: July 11, 2024; 4. "Truth in Reverse" Released: August 13, 2024; 5. "Por Ti" Released: September 3, 2024

My Side of the Mountain is the second studio album by American alternative pop musician Kat Von D. It was released on September 20, 2024, by Kartel Music Group. The record was written by Von D alongside Bobby Castro, Ferras, Fernando Garibay, Mr. Pharmacist, Sizzy Rocket, Shari Short and Sheppard Solomon, songwriters who had predominantly composed pop music. Von D said she wanted to introduce these writers to the darker elements of pop music and her "goth world".

The album was produced by Von D with Garibay, Paul Mullen, Ramiro Padilla, and Mr. Pharmacist, and features vocal contributions from Ferras and Alissa White-Gluz of Arch Enemy. The album's title was derived from Jean Craighead George's 1959 novel of the same name. Von D read the book as a child, and related to its themes of escapism and isolation. The album's lyrical content also contains references to Charles Baudelaire and other Romantic authors. Musically, it is an alternative pop record, also containing elements of alternative dance, dark wave, goth, new wave, post-punk and synthwave.

The record was preceded by the release of five singles: "Vampire Love", "Dead", "Illusion", "Truth in Reverse" and "Por Ti". Music videos were created for all of these songs, as well as album tracks "With You", "I Am a Machine", "Set Myself on Fire" and "All by Myself". Several of these music videos were created by horror movie director Ryan Valdez. The album received positive reviews from critics upon release, who praised Von D's vocals and the quality of songwriting. She promoted the album with an American tour.

== Background and recording ==
My Side of the Mountain is Kat Von D's second studio album. The record was co-written with songwriters who are predominantly known for composing material with pop artists, including Ferras, who had written songs with Dua Lipa and Katy Perry, and Shari Short, who wrote songs for Miley Cyrus and Ariana Grande. Other collaborators include Sheppard Solomon, who co-wrote songs for Kelly Clarkson, Enrique Iglesias and Natalie Imbruglia, while Fernando Garibay had worked with Lady Gaga, Bruno Mars and Kylie Minogue. "Por Ti" was written by Von D alongside Latin Grammy Award winner Bobby Castro. Von D said she wanted to introduce these songwriters to the darker elements of pop music, and her "goth world".

The album was recorded over a period of several months, with Von D saying she worked "9 to 5, five days a week for a few months, locked up in a room with my bandmates and songwriter friends." She said that while recording the album, she obtained an "admiration for songwriters", calling them "the real unsung heroes of this industry." She said her and her bandmates would "put together chord progressions on a synth landscape", and that co-writer Ferras would "walk in and crate these topline melodies out of his mind that would make me cry. They were so beautiful." The record features vocal contributions from Ferras and Alissa White-Gluz of Arch Enemy. Von D said she had been a long-time fan of Arch Enemy, but was hesitant about asking White-Gluz to collaborate, noting the two make different styles of music. She described White-Gluz as "one of the most talented friends I have. Getting to record her massive vocal range in person was beyond inspiring."

== Composition and style ==
Von D said she evolved as a songwriter and vocalist since the release of her debut album, saying her sophomore album was stronger in terms of songwriting, and that she improved as a vocalist between the two records. She said that despite being a predominantly electronic record, every song on My Side of the Mountain could be performed acoustically. Clash described it as an alternative pop album, albeit one that had a "neo-goth sound" that was "draped in luxuriant 80s synths". The Big Takeover described songs on the album as a "deft blend" of alternative pop, alternative dance, dark wave, goth, new wave, post-punk and synthwave.

The album's title was derived from Jean Craighead George's 1959 novel of the same name. Von D read the book as a child, and related to its themes of escapism and isolation. She said she "related so deeply to the little boy who ran away from home only to find comfort in isolation, self-reflection, and self-reliance in the wilderness." She described the album as a "love letter for all of the hopeless romantics, outsiders and lonely hearts trying to find their place in this cold and divisive world". She said that lyrically, the album was "about confronting the shit we don't want to face, accepting the things we can't control and fighting for the things that matter. This album is about my side of the argument. My side of the bed. My side of the line drawn in the sand. My side of the mountain. And I hope it makes others who feel the same, a little less alone in this world." The album's lyrical content also contains references to Charles Baudelaire and other Romantic authors.

Musically, although Von D said the material she composed was often "sad", she sought with My Side of the Mountain to create music "with just a tinge of hope". She elaborated she wanted to connect to people who "feel the same. Whether you feel like an outsider, that you don't belong, that you know, you don't feel alone in this world. That would be what I hope people take away from it. And obviously, if it makes you get up and shake your booty, that's cool, too."

== Release and promotion ==
The album was preceded by the release of several singles. "Vampire Love" was issued as the lead single on October 24, 2023. A gothic disco song, Von D said she wanted to compose "a dance song that sings about our human desire to find eternal love, no matter the cost. Our hearts' desperation is pathetic and admirable at the same time, and I think something everyone can relate to." Its music video was created by horror film director Ryan Valdez. Von D co-wrote the treatment for the video, saying she "wanted the story to revolve around a vampire boy and a vampire girl who are trying to find each other in a sad and lonely world." Von D's husband contributed to the video.

"Illusion"
The album's third single, "Illusion". The Big Takeover classified the song as a mix of alternative dance, alternative pop, goth, new wave, post-punk and synthwave.

"Dead" followed on May 30, 2024. Its music video was also directed by Valdez, and features Von D performing an aerobics routine. She said that while she prefers to make videos that feature a narrative, this video was "more on the simple side". She explained: "In this case, I knew from the day we wrote the song that I would be doing a goth aerobics video to go along with it. My intention was to have a serious take on a funny subject." The third single, "Illusion", was released on July 11. Its music video features Von D dressed as a witch dancing in a vibrant meadow. "Truth in Reverse" was released on August 13. Chaoszine said the song blends "disco goth with synthwave, goth, new wave and post-punk", while The Big Takeover said: "Never has a track sounded so forward-thinking and cutting-edge while also seeming like the best post-punk, darkwave-dancefloor anthem that somehow got lost in time." "Por Ti" was issued as a single on September 3, the same date its music video was released. The album was released on September 20, by Kartel Music Group.

Following the album's release, music videos for several other songs on the record were issued. A video for "With You", directed by Valdez, was released on September 24. A video for "I Am a Machine" was released on October 1. It was directed by Vicente Cordero, who had previously directed videos for Cradle of Filth and Filter. Blabbermouth.net described the song as "a unique blend of disco goth with influences drawing from synthwave, new wave, and post-punk, creating an iconic electronic sound reminiscent of the 1980s." Valdez also directed the music video for "Set Myself on Fire", which was released on October 8. A video for "All by Myself" followed on October 25. Von D began a tour of the United States on October 30.

== Critical reception ==
The album received positive reviews from music critics, with Von D's vocals and the quality of songwriting praised by numerous publications. Clash said that on the album, Von D examines "life's darker aspects", which they said allowed her the space to evolve as a songwriter by tackling complex subject matter. They said that even though she collaborated with other musicians, "the most vivid voice is Kat's own." mxdwn.com said the album "balances haunting and upbeat elements, often evoking a melancholy yet bold aesthetic." Their writer went on to say that what makes the album "a highlight is its ability to balance melancholy with empowerment. As Kat Von D sings of wanting to distance herself from inner demons, the music swells, creating an immersive, cinematic experience that resonates deeply with listeners." Devolution Magazine described Von D's vocals as "silky smooth with a rich tone", and said the album is interesting throughout because the mood and tempo of the songs consistently shift.

Cryptic Rock gave the album a perfect score and praised the quality of songwriting, saying it "takes you through the ups and downs of life and love." They said songs on the album were equally "beautiful and catchy", and that the album buries "deep underneath your skin while it simultaneously pulls you onto the dance floor." Spill Magazine described the album aas "pretty weighty and complex", calling it "a fascinating blend of contrasts". They commended her ability to "push boundaries and explore different facets of sound. While the instrumentals carry a vibrant, synthetic '80s vibe, the darker vocals add depth and complexity, creating a unique auditory experience." They summarized by calling the album "a bold statement in today's music scene, unapologetically showcasing Von D's creative range and emotional depth."

The album was listed on entertainment website Culture Fix as one of their best albums of 2024, highlighting "the pounding electro synths of Truth in Reverse, the cathartic power of Running Away, and cinematic sheen of Spanish language anthem Por Ti."

== Track listing ==
No.	Title	Writer(s)	Producer(s)	Length
1.	"Dead"	Kat Von D; Shari Short; Fernando Garibay	Kat Von D; Garibay; Ramiro Padilla	2:29
2.	"Vampire Love"	Kat Von D; Sheppard Solomon; Garibay	Kat Von D; Garibay; Padilla	3:45
3.	"H.A.T.E."	Kat Von D; Ferras; Garibay	Kat Von D; Garibay; Padilla	3:12
4.	"Truth in Reverse"	Kat Von D; Ferras; Garibay	Kat Von D; Garibay; Padilla	3:33
5.	"Set Myself on Fire" (featuring Ferras)	Kat Von D; Ferras; Mr. Pharmacist	Kat Von D; Paul Mullen; Mr. Pharmacist	3:26
6.	"I Am a Machine" (featuring Alissa White-Gluz)	Kat Von D; Ferras; Mr. Pharmacist	Kat Von D; Mullen; Mr. Pharmacist	3:42
7.	"Interlude II"	Kat Von D; Mr. Pharmacist	Kat Von D; Mullen; Mr. Pharmacist	2:15
8.	"Running Away"	Kat Von D; Short; Mr. Pharmacist	Kat Von D; Mullen; Mr. Pharmacist	3:27
9.	"Illusion"	Kat Von D; Solomon; Garibay	Kat Von D; Garibay; Padilla	3:15
10.	"With You"	Kat Von D; Sizzy Rocket; Garibay	Kat Von D; Garibay; Padilla	3:09
11.	"Por Ti"	Kat Von D; Bobby Castro	Kat Von D; Mullen; Mr. Pharmacist	2:18
12.	"All by Myself"	Eric Carmen	Kat Von D; Mullen; Mr. Pharmacist	1:34
Total length:				36:10

== Credits and personnel ==
Credits adapted from the liner notes of the CD version of the album.

- Kat Von D – vocalist, composer and producer
- Bobby Castro – composer
- Ian Dooley – photography
- Ferras – vocalist and composer
- Meghan Foley – artwork and design
- Gregg Foreman (credited as Mr. Pharmacist) – composer and producer
- Fernando Garibay – composer and producer
- Paul Mullen – producer
- Ramiro Padilla – producer
- Rob Rettberg – mixing and mastering
- Sizzy Rocket – composer
- Shari Short – composer
- Sheppard Solomon – composer
- Alissa White-Gluz – vocalist
