= Prayers (band) =

Mexican-American rock act

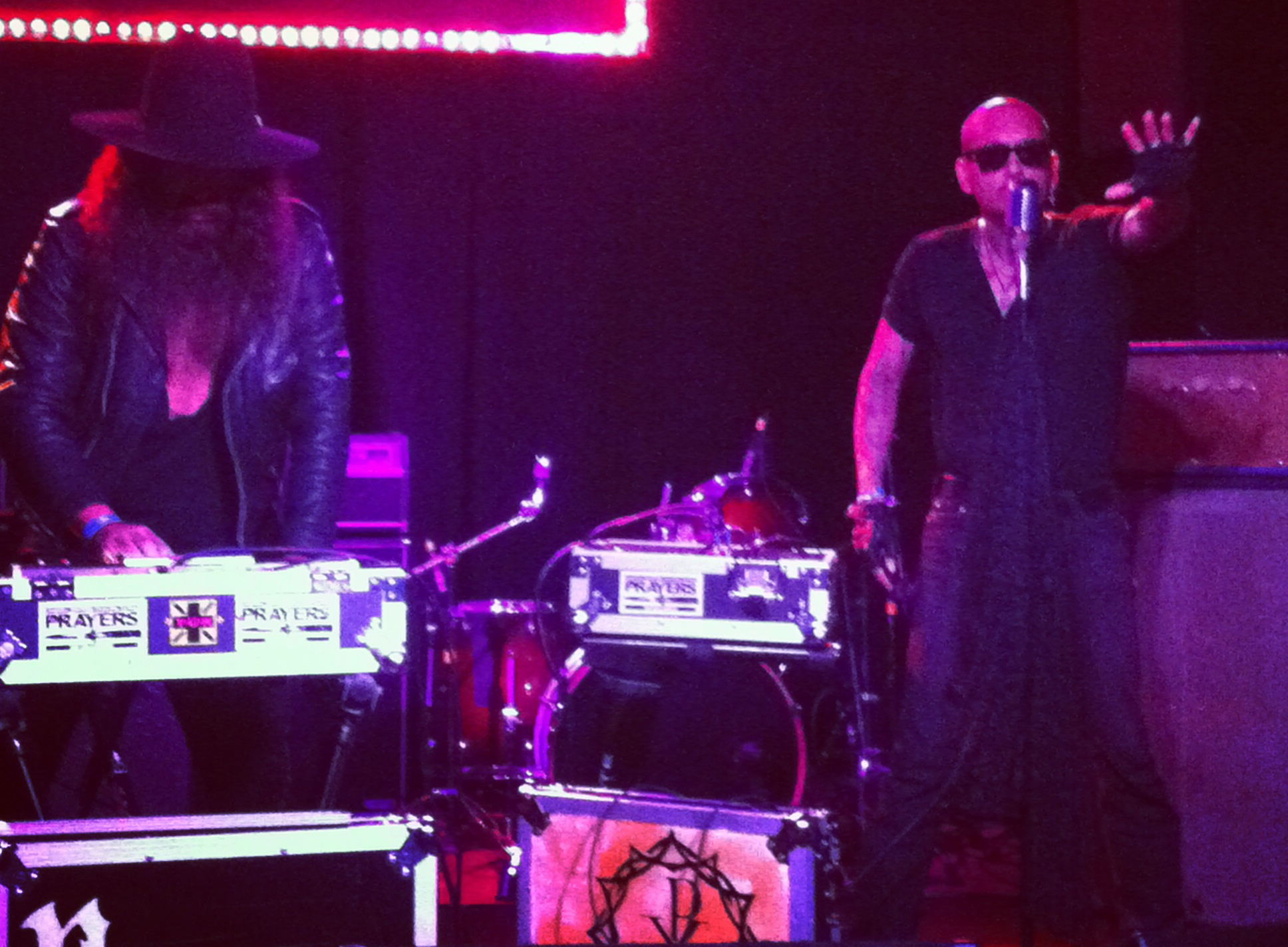
- Prayers. Left: Dave Parley; right Rafael Reyes, aka Leafar Seyer

Background information
- Origin: San Diego, California
- Genres: Electronic rock; synth-pop; darkwave
- Years active: 2013 - Present
- Label: LaSalle
- Members: Rafael Reyes
- Past members: Dave Parley

Prayers is a Mexican-American electronic duo founded in 2013 by Rafael Reyes and Dave Parley. According to vocalist Rafael Reyes (Leafar Seyer), the band's name originated from a dream Dave Parley had. Prayers began including other artists such as Travis Barker, and Kat Von D on Prayers' third album, "Young Gods." Prayers further expanded, collaborating with Christian Death, Pictureplane for The fifth album, "Chologoth - The Return Of Pluto" featured musicians Annie Hardy and Robert Harvey.

Prayers is the first musician/artist to use the term cholo goth to define this genre of music which lyrically explores the harsh realities of gang and street life over throbbing beats and swirling synthesizers.

Prayers is influenced by Christian Death, Depeche Mode, Bauhaus, Pet Shop Boys, Xmal Deutschland and other gothic rock and dark 80s music, as well as by Reyes' life as gang member in the Sherman Grant Hill Park 27 gang, one of San Diego's oldest gangs, also known as Sherman 27. He was jumped into the gang as a teenager. Prayers' music, lyrics and image breaks down stereotypes within the Goth and Cholo subcultures.

Prior to forming Prayers, Reyes, who was born in Cotija, Michoacán and came to San Diego as a young child, had created two other bands, Baptism of Thieves and Vampire, and performed in a solo project, Nite Ritual. Reyes and Parley, a Tijuana native, began recording immediately upon meeting. In three days they had recorded Prayers' first CD, SD KILLWAVE which they released independently on first as a CD and download and then on vinyl.

Reyes conceived two videos, "From Dog to God" and "Ready to Bleed" for SD KILLWAVE. The first was shot by Charles Parker, while the second, a narrative, was filmed by Gavin Filipiak, who continues to work with the band.

Prayers' video "Dog to God" caught the eye of the Cult frontman Ian Astbury who requested the band open for them on their 2014 spring tour of California and Nevada. Later that summer, Prayers released their second CD, GOTHIC SUMMER and Filipiak directed the video for the title track, which subsequently won the 2015 San Diego Film Festival Award for Best Music Video and Best Music Video Editing.

On May 26, 2015, Prayers premiered the title track of the Travis Barker-produced third CD, "Young Gods" as a video single, through Noisey/Vice Magazine. The video features a real brawl, with no punches pulled, between members of Sherman 27 who volunteered to be in the video. The album Young Gods was released June 23.

The follow-up single, "West End Girls," released July 30, was a cover of the Pet Shop Boys' song, and the video, featuring members of Sherman 27 and women from the San Diego Goth scene, was again conceived by Seyer, directed by Filipiak, and featured on Noisey. The cover and video would lead to Seyer conceiving of and co-directing with Filipiak the Pet Shop Boys' video for the song "Twenty-Something," which the Pet Shop Boys personally commissioned.

In October 2015, Prayers scored five nominations in the San Diego Music Awards, "the most in recent memory by a new group for the SDMA" and won for Best Alternative Band. Seyer, flanked by Parley and a semi-nude female escort, thanked his family and management, then derided awards for overlooking "Young Gods" in the video category, pointing out that Prayers' video had gotten 4x the YouTube views as the winner. The following year, 2016, the San Diego Academy of Music suspended their awards show, and resumed in 2017, having eliminated the video and several other categories, and revised the voting procedures, so that some categories are voted on by the public (and with only one vote per email address, vs earlier the one vote per person per day). Best album and song categories are still decided upon by the members of the San Diego Music Academy. Prayers received a nomination for Best Indie/Alternative Band.

The third single and video from Young Gods, "Drugs," featuring Travis Barker and DJ Klever, departed from the black and white style; it was animated and directed by Dani Moreno Cordero. The video was released in January 2016, in advance of the band's sold-out show at the El Rey in Los Angeles.

In anticipation of the 2016 Coachella show, Prayers released the single "Black Leather" featuring Kat Von D. The video was shot in both Los Angeles and San Diego, with Sherman gang members and Prayers' friends from the Southland goth scene, as well as Kat Von D. The single charted in Europe, knocking off Radiohead for the number one spot on Ausfahrt Indie Chart. Reyes and Kat von D. married in 2018.

It was announced in September, 2017,Prayers signed with the international label, BMG, with their full-length LP Baptism of Thieves to be released that November. They also announced the Friday, October 13 release of Cursed Be Thy Blessings, a collaborative EP with the surviving, original members of Christian Death, Rikk Agnew, James McGearty and Gitane Demone, which features a cover of the Christian Death song "Dogs" but re-configured as "Perros" (dogs in Spanish), with a Prayers song as the title track. A documentary about the making of the EP, Beyond and Back, written and directed by Kenny Ochoa and Bryan Ray Turcotte and shot by Estevan Oriol and Ramez Silyan, was released on the same day.

Prayers toured with A Perfect Circle in 2017. In December 2017, while heading in Los Angeles, Prayers announced from the stage a special guest, "My future wife, Kat Von D." The couple married in February, 2018 with Von D appearing on stage with Reyes and Parley on numerous occasions. In 2020 Prayers toured with Von D, with Parley playing in both ensembles.

Prayers released "Chologoth - The Return Of Pluto" on February 2, 2022 on his own label, working with Annie Hardy and Robert Harvey.

== Discography ==
Studio albums
Year	Title	Label
2013	SD Killwave (Album)	CD Baby / Prayers
2014	Gothic Summer (EP)	CD Baby / Prayers
2015	Young Gods (Album)	Lasalle
2016	Black Leather (Single)	BMG Rights Management (US)
2016	Mexica (Single)	CD Baby / Prayers
2017	Cursed Be Thy Blessings (EP)	BMG Rights Management (US)
2017	Baptism Of Thieves (Album)	BMG Rights Management (US)
2020	Wild Roses (Single)	CD Baby / Prayers
2020	Choloani (Single)	CD Baby / Prayers
2020	La Vida Es Un Sueno (Single)	CD Baby / Prayers
2022	Young Gods Never Die (Single)	CD Baby / Prayers
2022	Chologoth - The Return Of Pluto (Album)	CD Baby / Prayers
2026	No Tengo Calma (Single)	CD Baby / Prayers
