= Mike Libby =

American artist (born 1976)

Born in 1976 in Maine, Mike Libby is a contemporary American artist who created the Insect Lab in 1999 after graduating from the Rhode Island School of Design. Within this sculptural series, he combines real preserved insect specimens with mechanical components, in order to create whimsical bio-cybernetic sculptures.

== Formation ==
He graduated with a degree in sculpture from the Rhode Island School of Design in 1999 and has attended the Vermont Studio Center, exhibited Insect Lab through the Smithsonian, Society of arts and Crafts in Boston, showcased by Neiman Marcus and Anthropologie, Edmund Scientific and designed three book covers in addition to hand fabricating the Solstice Award annually for the Science Fiction Writers of America.
