= Professional Artist (magazine) =

American art trade magazine (1986–-)

Professional Artist is an American bimonthly art trade magazine that provides tools and resources for visual artists. It was established under the name Art Calendar in 1986 and provides tips and insight on becoming a professional artist and cultivating the skills that are necessary for being successful in the arts world. The magazine covers a large variety of different topics in each issue, including art marketing, sales techniques, exhibition presentation, communication skills, art law and portfolio development. It is published by Turnstile Media Group and is based in Orlando, Florida.
