= Paul Paiement =

American artist (born 1966)

Paul Paiement (born 1966; Minneapolis, Minnesota) is an American artist based in Long Beach, CA whose paintings and sculptures focus on the impact of mankind and the built environment on the natural world. His detailed, painterly landscapes are overlaid with angular, airbrushed Plexiglass shapes, indicating the disruption of man on nature. His series of "Hybrids" transforms everyday electronic gadgets to resemble various insect forms, classically rendering the insects in egg tempera. Electronic overlays depicted by a series of dots created with wooden dowels, referencing to the halftone screens of vintage ads and the digital pixels of modern photography.

Paiement both contrasts and integrates "the ‘man made’ synthetic elements of ‘culture’ with the natural world.". His work is often referred to term of Romanticism, as he attempts to reconcile the effects of man's nature upon Nature.

== Education ==
As a teen Paul Paiement attended North Community High School, focusing on their arts program. He graduated from Minneapolis College of Art and Design (MCAD) and attended graduate school at the University of Southern California (USC).

== Career ==
Paiement has shown throughout Asia, Europe and the United States in both solo and group shows. His solo exhibitions include the Laguna Art Museum (Laguna Beach, California), Palazzo del Bargello (Gubbio, Italy), and Carrousel du Louvre, The Louvre (Paris, France). Paiement is tenured professor (painting/drawing) at Cypress College.
