= Rafael Reyes (artist) =

American singer-songwriter

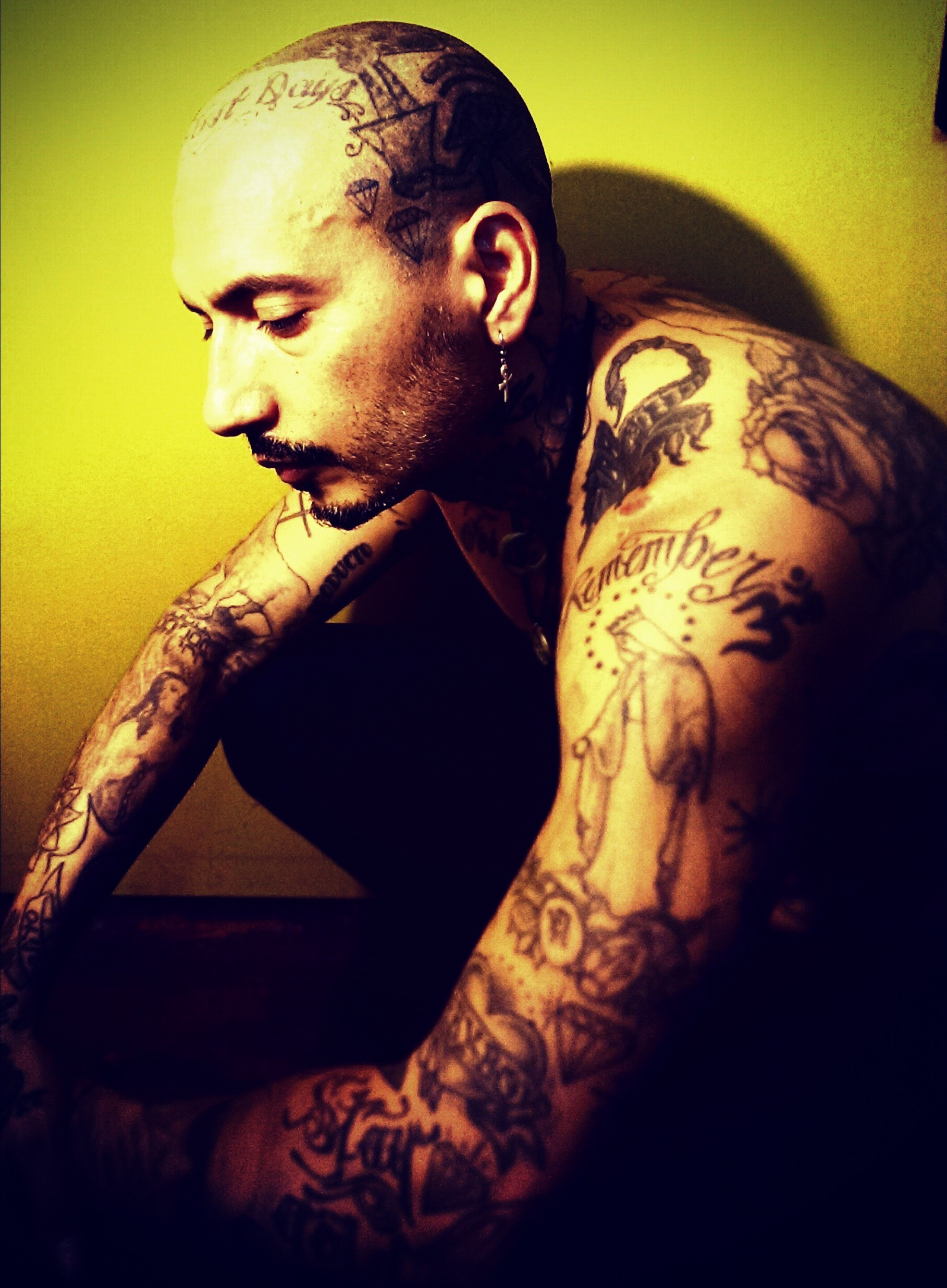
- Born: August 2, 1975 (age 51); Cotija de la Paz, Michoacán, Mexico
- Other names: Leafar Seyer; Nite Ritual
- Occupations: Author; artist; musician
- Spouse: Kat Von D (m. 2018)
- Musical career
- Genres: Goth; electronic; Chicano rock; electronic rock; hip hop
- Instruments: Vocals; keyboards; guitar; synthesizer
- Years active: 2010–present
- Website: www.chologoth.com

Rafael Reyes (born August 2, 1975), also credited as Leafar Seyer, is a Mexican American author, artist and musician credited with creating the cholo goth genre of music, which lyrically explores the realities of gang and street life.

Reyes frequently mixes Western esotericism with Olmec beliefs.

== Biography ==
Reyes joined the Sherman 27th Street Grant Hill Park gang when he was a teenager to save his father's life after a skirmish at a local market. Upon graduating high school, Reyes opened San Diego's first vegan/vegetarian Mexican restaurant, Pokéz, with his father. After running the restaurant for eighteen years, and after his father's death, he sold Pokéz to his younger brother. In 2011, he wrote and published Living Dangerously, a roman à clef about his life as a gang member, and toured California to promote the book.

=== Music ===
Looking for a more direct way to interact with an audience, in 2011, Reyes formed his first band, Baptism of Thieves, followed by Vampire. With the break-up of those bands, he created Prayers (credited under the pseudonym Leafar Seyer) with Tijuana-born Dave Parley. He also performs solo as Nite Ritual.

Prayers released their debut album SD KILLWAVE in 2013, with two videos, "From Dog to God" directed by Chukk Nastee aka Charles Christ and "Ready to Bleed". Prayers then released an EP entitled, GOTHIC SUMMER, in mid-2014. Prayers opened for the Cult during that band's 2014 tour.

Reyes conceived Prayers' video for the song "Gothic Summer," the title track of their first EP, released in May 2014, which won the 2015 San Diego Film Festival Award for Best Music Video. Gavin Filipiak, the video's director also won for Best Editing in the music video category.

On May 26, 2015, Prayers released the title track of the Travis Barker-produced second album, "Young Gods" as a video single, through Noisey/Vice Magazine. In the song, he references Aleister Crowley: The lyrics "do what thy will shall be the law" is an homage to the English occultist's "Do what thou wilt shall be the whole of the Law," while Crowley's magical formula for Tetragrammaton is explicated in the song's final lines.

=== Art ===
He also began to focus on his artwork, showing in San Diego. He has since shown in Los Angeles at Coagula Curatorial with John Fleck and John Roecker as part of the successful "Two Johns and a Whore" group show.

Reyes developed and then left Diamond Dogs, a group of retired gang members with an interest in art and music, as an outlet for young men looking for an alternative to gang life. Diamond Dogs provides outreach, emotional and artistic support in a positive environment while stressing the importance of community and family.

In January 2015, Reyes was included in a special exhibition at the LA Art Show, "Dark Progressivism: Metropolis Rising" which included important Southern Californian Chicano, Cholo and street artists. "Dark Progressivism: Metropolis Rising" was the first international showing of this uniquely Southern California genre.

Reyes's sculpture Southland debuted at Lancaster Museum of Art and History (MOAH) as part of "Dark Progressivism: The Built Environment" which ran November 22, 2017, through January 2018. The exhibition included many important, influential, and internationally known artists from Southern California, many of whom, like Reyes, created new work for the museum show. Prayers videos were incorporated as part of the overall installation.

On February 24, 2018, his first solo art show in several years opened at These Days, in downtown Los Angeles, dovetailing with the release of Prayers' video, "One 9 One 3".

== Personal life ==
Reyes met Kat Von D in 2016, when Von D appeared in a video per Reyes' request. Reyes also wrote the song "Black Leather" for Von D, who provided vocals for the duets and additional tracks. The song is on the album 'Baptism of Thieves'. Von D is featured in the video for the song. Reyes married Kat Von D legally on February 21, 2018, in Beverly Hills. The couple have one son together, Leafar. Reyes also has a daughter from a previous relationship from whom he is estranged.

Reyes served six months in prison in 2010 for assault, giving him strikes under California's three-strikes law, meaning one more conviction could result in him going to prison for decades or life.
