= Don Suggs =

American artist (1945–2019)

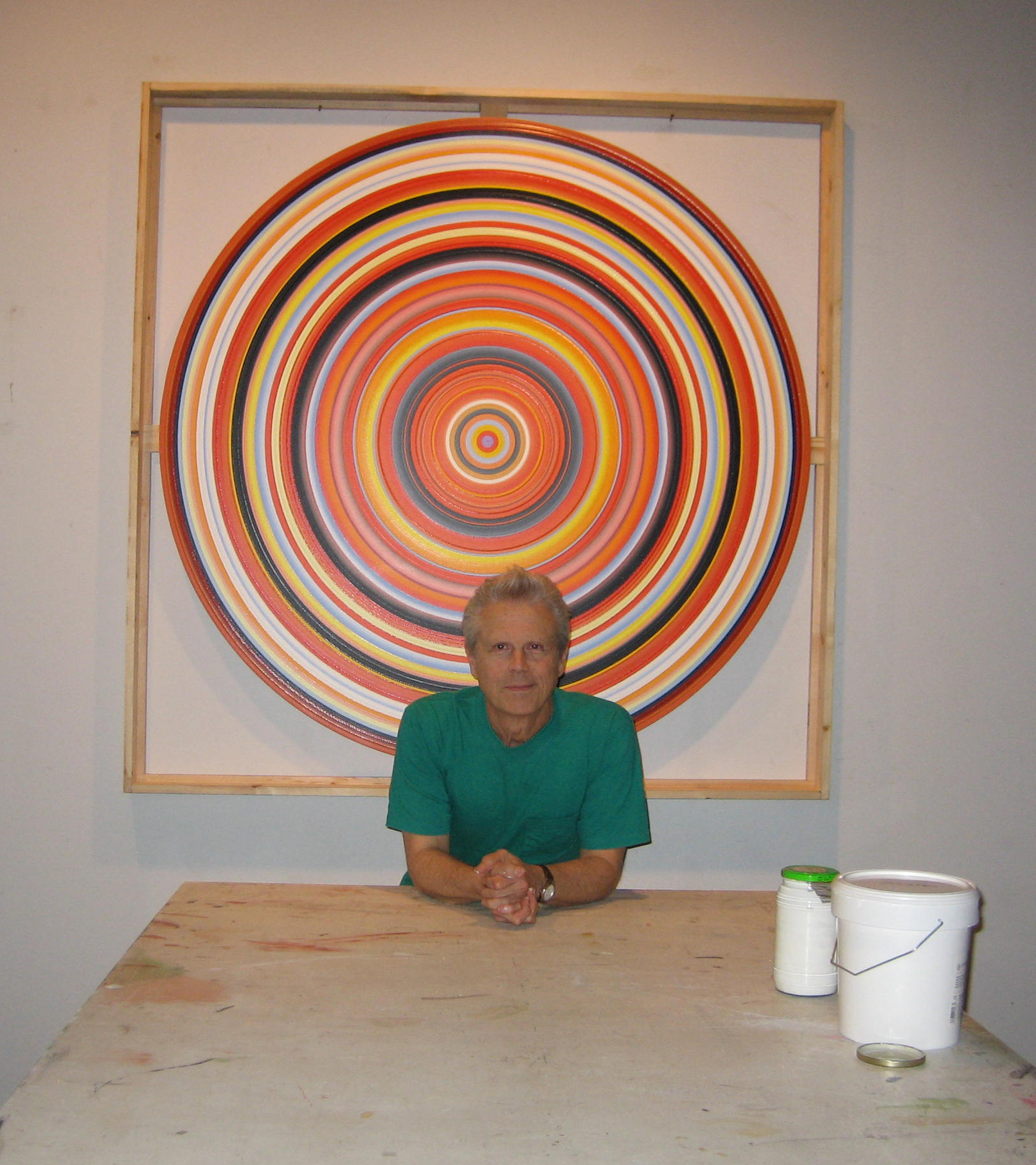
- Suggs in his Los Angeles studio, February 2007
- Born: March 16, 1945; Fort Worth, Texas, U.S.
- Died: July 30, 2019 (aged 74); Los Angeles, California, U.S.
- Education: MA & MFA in Art
- Alma mater: UCLA

Don Suggs (March 16, 1945 – July 30, 2019) was an American artist based in Los Angeles, California. His paintings, drawings, photographs and sculptures are notable for their use of color.

== Biography ==
Suggs was born in Fort Worth, Texas, and grew up in San Diego. He received a B.A. in 1969 from University of California, Los Angeles (UCLA), having studied psychology, film, and art. He received both an M.A. in 1971 and an M.F.A. in Art in 1972 from UCLA.

Suggs taught drawing, painting, sculpture and color theory from 1972-1984 at Florida State University at Tallahassee, Franconia College in New Hampshire, University of Southern California, and Otis Art Institute. From 1983-2014, he taught painting and drawing at UCLA. Over the years, he has been co-editor with Paul Vangelisti of several non-profit art and literature publications: Boxcar, Forehead, and Ribot. He published four art and poetry books, collaborating with Paul Vangelisti and Martha Ronk.

Suggs lived and worked in Los Angeles. He died on July 30, 2019, after being struck by a vehicle while walking.

== Career ==
During his career, Suggs has worked in three to five year periods with a particular style. Suggs' major bodies of work include Passions, Autochthonous Views, Proprietary Views, Portraits, Old Genres, Heuristic Paintings, Tondototems, Paint Ons and Feastpoles. Suggs' work is widely varied, including geometric abstraction, abstract expressionism, conceptualism, photorealism and pop art. Due to this he has been described as "an artist's artist".

=== Awards ===
Suggs was awarded the National Endowment for the Arts grant in both 1973 and 1991.

=== Exhibitions ===
Since 1970, Suggs' works have been included in many solo and group exhibitions across the United States. His work is represented by L.A. Louver gallery in Venice, California.
