= Myartspace =

Defunct social networking site

myartspace.com
- Website type: Artist community
- Dissolved: 2012; 14 years ago
- Owner: Catmacart Corporation
- Creator: Catherine McCormack-Skiba
- Commercial: Yes
- Registration: free and Premium accounts
- Launched: 2006; 20 years ago
- Current status: inactive

Myartspace was a social networking service for artists. It was launched in 2006 and shut down in 2012. In 2008 the site hosted over 500,000 images of contemporary art and contained a large collection of interviews with emerging artists.

== Art competitions and exhibits ==
Myartspace had been involved with international art fairs such as the Bridge Art Fair and Aqua Art Miami.

The site closed down in January 2012 and its address is now redirected to godaddy.com.

== Origins ==
Myartspace was founded by Catherine McCormack-Skiba in 2005 in order to help artists gain representation, recognition, and sell their artwork directly to buyers. The site was launched in May 2006.

== Myartspace Art Scholarship Program ==
In 2008 myartspace launched an annual art scholarship competition. The free to enter art competition was open to undergraduate and graduate art students worldwide. The scholarship program focused on art students who exhibit exceptional artistic excellence in their chosen visual art medium. The site provided three scholarship prizes for undergraduate students and three scholarship prizes for graduate students. First place winners in each category are awarded a $5000 cash art scholarship. Second and Third placement receive $2000 and $1000 respectively.
