= Gajin Fujita =

American contemporary artist

Gajin Fujita K2S KGB
- ガジン・フジタ
- Born: 1972 (age 53–54)
- Education: UNLV; Otis College of Art and Design
- Movement: Graffiti
- Website: gajinfujita.com

Gajin Fujita (ガジン・フジタ; born 1972) is a contemporary artist from East Los Angeles. He is a member of LA graffiti crews K2S (Kill 2 Succeed) and KGB (Kids Gone Bad).

== Background and education ==
He was born in 1972 to Japanese parents. Fujita holds an MFA from the University of Nevada, Las Vegas and a BFA from Otis College of Art and Design.

== Career ==
Fujita's work has been widely exhibited at galleries and museums such as Los Angeles County Museum of Art (LACMA), Kemper Museum of Contemporary Art (Kansas City), L.A. Louver Gallery and several international venues in Switzerland, Greece, Australia and Belgium. He is represented by L.A. Louver in Venice, CA.

== Style ==
Fujita blends Eastern techniques (anime, partitioned screens, ukiyo-e), and elements (geishas, warriors, demons), with Western, urban imagery (Latino graffiti, U.S. pop culture imagery). His works embody the cultural and class contradictions that are an integral part of urban Los Angeles.

In 2005 he exhibited with Pablo Vargas-Lugo at the Los Angeles County Museum of Art. In 2012, five of his works were shown at the Pacific Asia Museum in Pasadena, California.

== Solo exhibitions ==
2026 Gajin Fujita, ADAA Fair 2026, Park Avenue Armory, New York, NY, 12–16 November 2026

2024 Gajin Fujita: Blessings and Curses of this World, Buchmann Galerie, Berlin, Germany, 13 September - 9 November 2024

2023 Gajin Fujita: True Colors, L.A. Louver, Venice, CA, 29 March - 6 May 2023 (catalogue)

2019 Gajin Fujita, Frieze Los Angeles, Paramount Pictures Studio, Los Angeles, CA, 14–17 February 2019

2015 Warriors, Ghosts and Ancient Gods of the Pacific, L.A. Louver, Venice, CA, 27 May - 3 July 2015

Gajin Fujita, Hunter Museum of American Art, Chattanooga, TN, 10 April - 7 June 2015

2014 Gajin Fujita: Drawings, L.A. Louver, Venice, CA, 13 March - 26 April 2014

2012 Gajin Fujita: Ukiyo-e in Contemporary Painting, Pacific Asia Museum, Pasadena, CA, 20 April - 7 October 2012

2011 Made in L.A., L.A. Louver, Venice, CA, 13 October - 26 November 2011 (catalogue)

2008 Pacific Tsunami, Haunch of Venison, London, 25 April - 25 May 2008 (catalogue)

2006 Twilight Blush, L.A. Louver, Venice, CA, 16 November - 30 December 2006

Zephyr: Paintings by Gajin Fujita, Kemper Museum of Contemporary Art, Kansas City, MO, 8 September - 5 November 2006 (catalogue)

2004 Gajin Fujita, Galerie Rolf Ricke, Cologne, Germany, 28 October - 14 December 2004

2003 Gajin Fujita, Kravets Wehby Gallery, New York, NY, 18 October - 29 November 2003

2002 Gajin Fujita: Wicked Beauty, L.A. Louver, Venice, CA, 12 September - 12 October 2002

2001 Gajin Fujita: Wicked Beauty, L.A. Louver, Venice, CA, 12 September - 12 October 2002

2000 Gajin Fujita, Kravets Wehby Gallery, New York, NY

1999 Gajin Fujita, Archie Grant Hall Gallery, Las Vegas, NV

== See also ==
- L.A. Louver Gallery
