= Kim Dingle =

American painter and installation artist (born 1951)

- Born: 1951 (age 74–75); Pomona, California
- Education: Cal State Los Angeles, Claremont Graduate School

Kim Dingle (born 1951) is a Los Angeles-based contemporary artist working across painting, sculpture, photography, found imagery, and installation. Her practice explores themes of American culture, history, and gender politics through both figurative and abstract approaches.

== Early life ==
Dingle was born in Pomona, California in 1951. She received a Master of Fine Arts from Claremont Graduate School in 1990 and a Bachelor of Fine Arts from Cal State Los Angeles in 1988.

== Work ==
Dingle works in series, some of her most well-known of which are her paintings of maps from memory, installations and paintings of Dingle's id doppelgänger Priss, the saga of Fatty and Fudge, Home Depot coloring books (anyone can do it), painting blindfolded and the Crush painting series,

=== 1990s ===
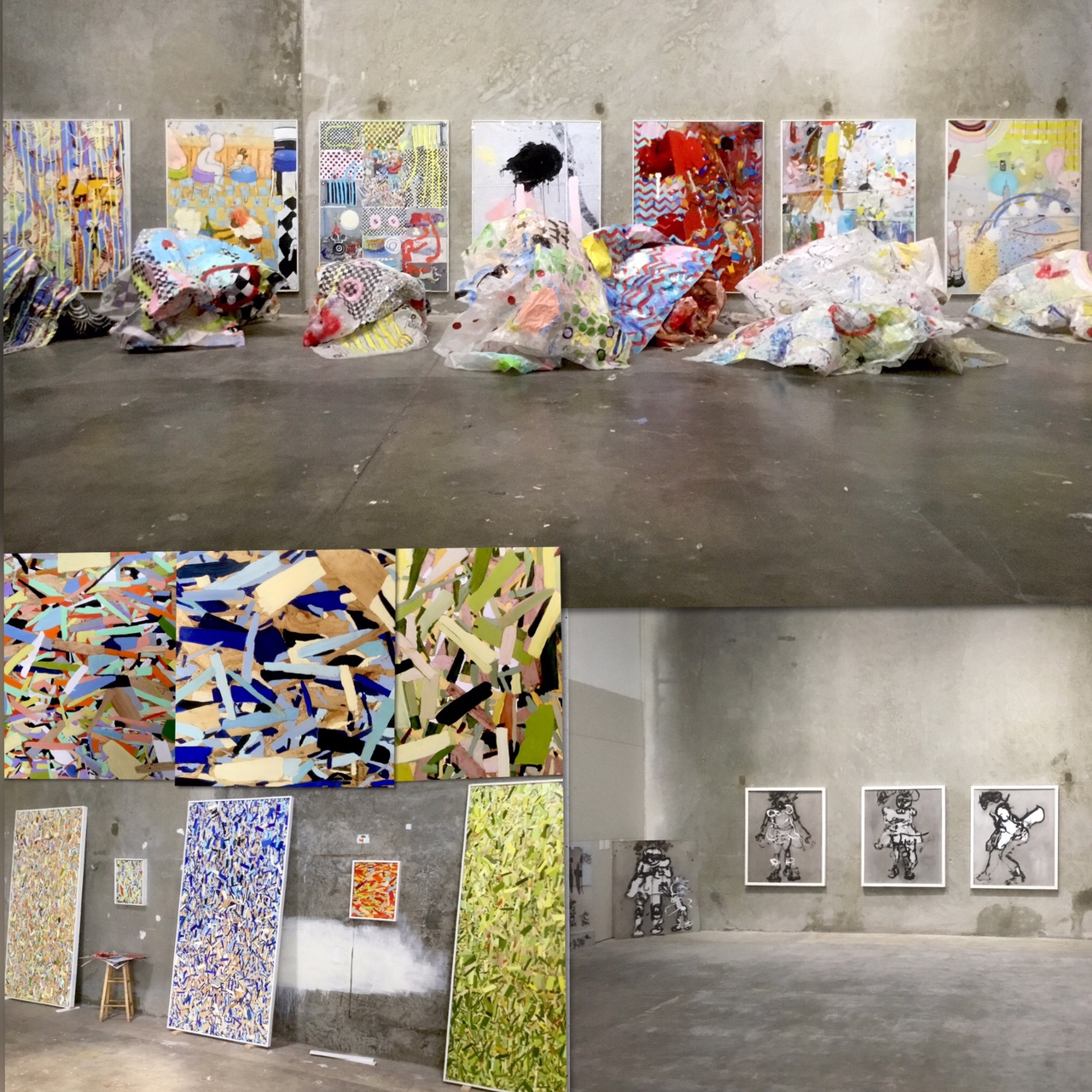
Image of current Kim Dingle artwork

Her first mainstream solo exhibition was in 1991 at Richard/Bennett Gallery in Los Angeles. Titled Portraits from the Dingle Library, it combined images of her mother, Cram, with portraits of iconic figures like George Washington, Queen Elizabeth II, and George Foreman as a baby. Shortly after this, she created the "Paintings of the West" series employing vintage wallpaper and other imagery as her canvas along with a hundred curated drawings of "Horses by Teenage Girls". In Untitled (Girls with Dresspole) (1998), Dingle's girls raise a flagpole "dresspole" (a long pole with a dress attached to the top) in a pose reminiscent of the famous photograph of soldiers raising the flag on Iwo Jima.

Following works included the Never in School series, where Dingle introduced school mates, where characters Fatty and Fudge dominate in the absence of adults or boys.

Dingle created three-dimensional works featuring Fatty and Fudge in 1993 named "Priss". These installations were first shown at Blum & Poe in Los Angeles and Jack Tilton in New York; they also toured European museums with Sunshine Noir: the Art of Los Angeles and The Smithsonian Museum of American Art, Washington D.C. Priss now resides in the permanent collections at MOCA Los Angeles.

=== 2000s ===
Priss later took the form of a 1963 MG midget car and was shown in the 2000 Whitney Biennial.

In 2000, with chef (actor and author) Aude Charles, Dingle opened a fine dining vegetarian restaurant in the middle of her studio and called it Fatty's. .

=== 2010s ===
In 2017 and 2018 her work Painting Blindfolded was shown at Susanne Vielmetter Los Angeles Projects and Sperone Westwater in New York City. Her piece I Will Be Your Server: The Lost Supper Paintings was exhibited at Susanne Vielmetter Los Angeles Projects in 2019.

=== 2020s ===
In 2021, artist Jamian Juliano-Villani opened a gallery with artist Billy Grant and musician Ruby Zarsky called O’Flaherty's in which the first show was a 50-year survey of Dingle's work. The artist Lia Clay Miller notes that the show consisted of various renditions of Dingle's signature “Psycho-Tods." Dingle's work was included in the 2022 exhibition Women Painting Women at the Modern Art Museum of Fort Worth.

== Collections ==
Her work is included in the collection of the Whitney Museum of American Art, the Laguna Art Museum, the Museum of Contemporary Art, Los Angeles, the Los Angeles County Museum of Art and the National Gallery of Art, Washington.
