= Diane Gamboa =

American painter (born 1957)

- Born: 1957 (age 68–69); Los Angeles, California
- Education: Otis College of Art and Design
- Known for: Painting, Photography, Performance Art

Diane Gamboa (born 1957) has been producing, exhibiting and curating visual art in Southern California since the 1980s. She has also been involved art education, ranging from after-school programs to college and university teaching. Gamboa has been "one of the most active cultural producers in the Chicana art movement in Los Angeles." She actively developed the Chicano School of Painting.

== Early life and education ==
Gamboa had been producing art most of her life. She learned early on that Los Angeles was a city that was "fragmented" and "segregated by race, class and power." Recognizing this as a young person has informed much of her body of work. In 1984 Gamboa received her degree from Otis College of Art and Design.

== Career and Work ==
She is a recipient of a California Community Foundation Individual Artist Grant, and her solo exhibitions include “Bruja–Ha” at Tropico de Nopal Gallery and “Chica Chic” at Patricia Correia Gallery in Santa Monica. Her work is included in Cheech Marin's personal collection of Chicano art and has been shown at the Los Angeles County Museum of Art and the Riverside Art Museum

Gamboa's work was included in Xican-a.o.x. Body, a heavily studied group exhibition on the experiences, contributions and collaborations of Chicano artists in contemporary culture with artworks from the 1960s to the present times. The show traveled from the Cheech Marin Center for Chicano Art & Culture at the Riverside Art Museum, California, to the Pérez Art Museum Miami, Florida.

=== ASCO, Punk and Paper Fashion ===
In the early ‘80s, she photographically documented the East Los Angeles punk rock scene. From 1980 to 1987, she was a member of ASCO, a conceptual multi-media performance art group. Gamboa appeared in performances and also created costumes and makeup concepts that "shaped the group's look."

Gamboa organized numerous site-specific "Hit and Run" paper fashion shows which were "created as easily disposable street wear." Her fascination with paper fashion can be traced to an ASCO fashion show organized by in 1982 by member Gronk, where he insisted all entries must be made of paper. Her paper fashion shows disrupted the activities of people on the street, blurring the lines between art and everyday life. Gamboa's creation of paper fashion is both the realization of childhood dreams of glamor and a commentary on the disposable nature of high fashion.

The "easily disposable streetwear" became quite popular and some designs were collected by museums. Gamboa created more than 75 different fashions, ranging from dresses, purses and cross-gender outfits. Her paper fashions make "clear that creativity is restricted only by the tools and the labor that are economically within reach...they exhibit longing for more fulfilling and creative social intercourse." However, while there is a desire to play out the glamorous nature of fashion, Gamboa's work also comments on the gendered nature of the fashion industry and the erotic norms of clothing.

=== Exploring Identity and Space ===
During the ‘90s, Gamboa's work had a very strong sense of place, including fictional places which were "anti-sexist, anti-racist and anti-hetero-normative." In Pin Up, Gamboa explores male-female relationships through a series of ink drawings on vellum. She explores the intersection of gender in the body and the relationships between the body and the inanimate. Many of the figures depicted in this series are tattooed, which reflects an interest Gamboa has in learning to tattoo others herself.

The Endangered Species series builds on the work started with the Pin Up drawings, turning the ink drawings into in a three-dimensional form.

The Bruja-Ha series was created around 2004. The art included in "Bruja-Ha" represents some of the very spiritual and performance-related aspects of Gamboa's work. Dirt from her father's grave was mixed into the paint, making it a very personal statement. Gamboa relates that her father had been ill during the time she had been working on "Bruja-Ha."

The Invasion of the Snatch (2007) is a series of 9 paintings that explore the feminine body and is Gamboa's "tribute" to unidentified female victims of rape and murder.

Gamboa's series, Alien Invasion: Queendom Come (2006-2012) is an exploration of Mexican identity in American culture. She explores the idea of "why only Mexicans are called aliens while others are called immigrants," creating drawings and paintings of blue-skinned, "Amazonian aliens." Alien Invasion invites viewers to rethink their ideas about immigrants, especially those of Latino origin.
