= Chung King Road =

Pedestrian street in Los Angeles, California, U.S.

Coordinates: 34.066095°N 118.238465°W

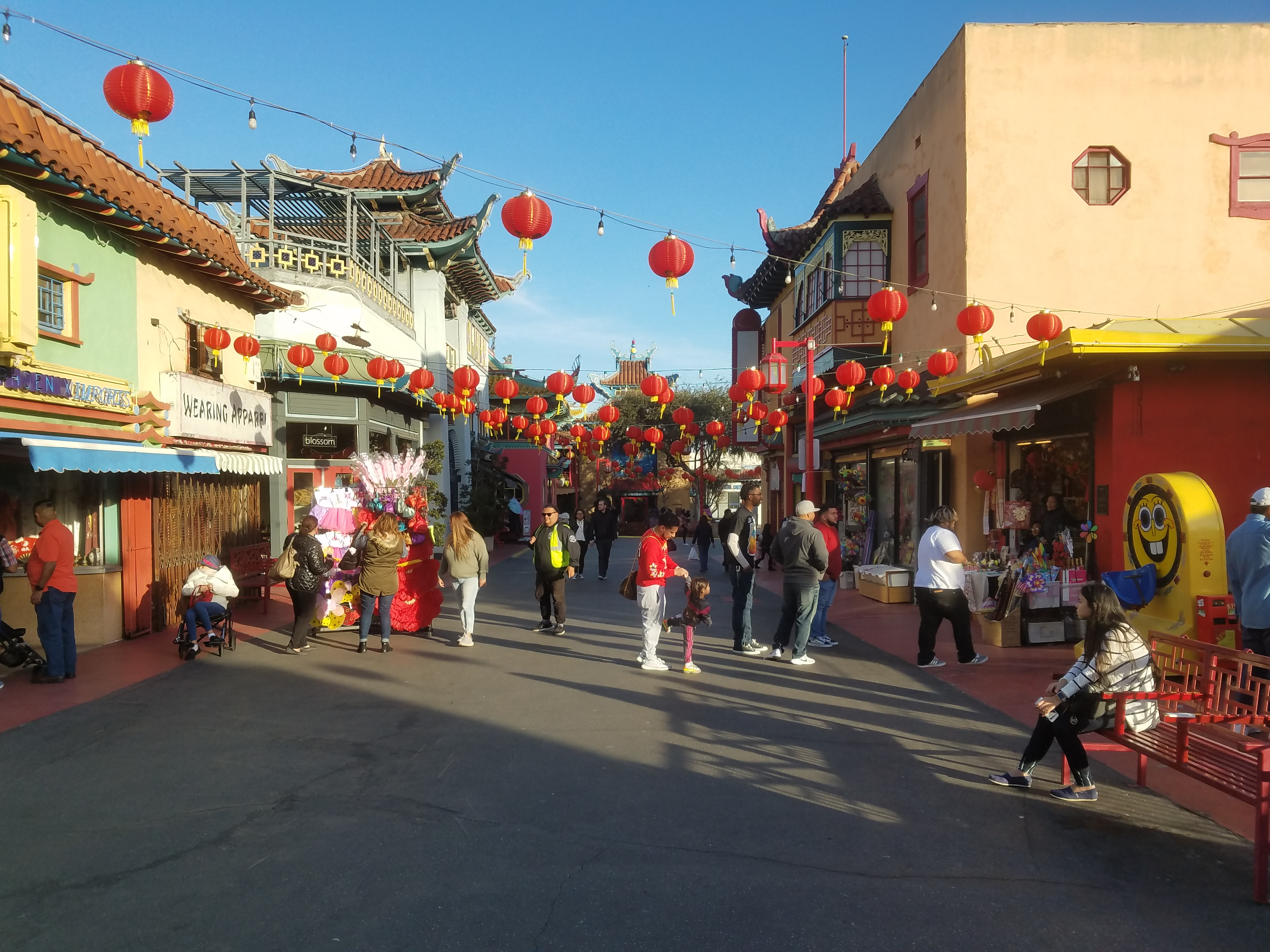
- Interactive map of Chung King Road
- Type: Pedestrian mall
- Owner: Los Angeles
- Location: Chinatown, Los Angeles

Other
- Known for: Chinese specialty shops, art galleries

Chung King Road, along with Chung King Court containing a water fountain in its center, is a pedestrian street complex in the northwest corner of Chinatown, Los Angeles, United States. This street is a part of "New Chinatown", built in the 1930s and 1940s, and was the location of mostly Chinese specialty shops, importers of Chinese art objects, and Chinese benevolent associations. In the late 1990s many of the storefronts were sitting unused, and several of them were converted into art galleries and art studios. With its nearly weekly schedule of art gallery exhibition openings, Chung King Road is now one of the centers of art and nightlife in Downtown Los Angeles. Annual events include Chinese New Year and the Golden Dragon Parade, The Moon Festival, KCRW's Chinatown Summer Nights, the closing party of LA's Design Week and the Perform! Now! Festival.
