= Pilar Tompkins Rivas =

American museum executive, curator, and arts administrator

Pilar Tompkins Rivas is an American museum executive, curator, and arts administrator. She has held leadership and curatorial positions at institutions including the Lucas Museum of Narrative Art, the Vincent Price Art Museum, the Los Angeles County Museum of Art (LACMA), and the 18th Street Arts Center. Her work focuses on narrative art, Latinx and Latin American art, youth culture, and community-centered museum practice. She has organized nationally and internationally recognized exhibitions, contributed to scholarship on contemporary art and photography, and played a significant role in expanding institutional approaches to Latinx and Latin American art. In 2022, she delivered the commencement address for the University of Texas at Austin’s College of Fine Arts.

== Early life and education ==
Tompkins Rivas was born and raised in Dallas, Texas, and attended Booker T. Washington High School for the Performing and Visual Arts, where she graduated salutatorian. She earned undergraduate degrees at the University of Texas at Austin and pursued additional studies in São Paulo and Salvador, Brazil, and Florence, Italy. She later completed her master’s and doctoral coursework at Claremont Graduate University.

=== Early career ===
Tompkins Rivas relocated to Los Angeles in 2001, where she began her career in community arts and mural restoration. Drawing on her background as a studio artist and trained muralist, she restored a canvas panel mural by Chicana artist Judith F. Baca at the Social and Public Art Resource Center (SPARC) in Venice, California.

She later served as director of several prominent Los Angeles galleries, including the Patricia Faure Gallery and The Project, working with artists such as John Divola, Llyn Foulkes, Jacob Hashimoto, Mark Bradford, Julie Mehretu, Paul Pfeiffer, Aernout Mik, Yoshua Okón, Tracey Rose, María Elena González, Coco Fusco, Daniel Joseph Martinez, and Kori Newkirk.

==== Vexing: Female Voices from East LA Punk (2008) ====
In 2008, Tompkins Rivas co-curated ''Vexing: Female Voices from East LA Punk'' at the Claremont Museum of Art, an exhibition highlighting the contributions of women to the East Los Angeles punk movement of the 1970s and 1980s. The show featured artists and musicians including Diane Gamboa, Alice Bag, Exene Cervenka, Teresa Covarrubias, Louis Jacinto, and Shizu Saldamando.

== Career ==
=== Los Angeles County Museum of Art (LACMA) ===
From 2013 to 2016, Tompkins Rivas served as Coordinator of Curatorial Initiatives at the Los Angeles County Museum of Art. She helped establish and codirect the UCLA–LACMA Art History Practicum Initiative and the Andrew W. Mellon Undergraduate Curatorial Fellowship Program. She also contributed to the Getty’s Pacific Standard Time: LA/LA initiative, co-curating major exhibitions including ''Home—So Different, So Appealing'' and ''A Universal History of Infamy''.

==== Home—So Different, So Appealing (2017) ====
Co-curated with Mari Carmen Ramírez and Chon A. Noriega, ''Home—So Different, So Appealing'' was presented at LACMA as part of Pacific Standard Time: LA/LA. The exhibition featured works by more than 40 artists from across the Americas and explored themes of belonging, displacement, migration, and domesticity. It received widespread critical acclaim; ''The New Yorker'' described it as a “tour de force” and “a big, keen show.” ''Los Angeles Times'' critic Carolina A. Miranda praised the exhibition for challenging conventional narratives of Latin American and U.S. Latino art.

=== Vincent Price Art Museum (VPAM) ===
In 2016, Tompkins Rivas was appointed Director of the Vincent Price Art Museum (VPAM) at East Los Angeles College, becoming the first Latina to lead the museum since its founding in 1957. There she curated early exhibitions of prominent artists including Patrick Martinez, Gabriela Ruiz, Edgar Fabián Frías, Beatriz Cortez, Guadalupe Rosales, and Umar Rashid, among others.

==== Tastemakers & Earthshakers (2016) ====
Her inaugural exhibition, ''Tastemakers & Earthshakers: Notes From Los Angeles Youth Culture, 1943–2016'', examined seven decades of youth culture in Los Angeles. Pulitzer Prize–winning critic Christopher Knight described the exhibition as “engaging” and “provocative,” noting that Tompkins Rivas and her team “smartly pick and choose” materials to frame youth style within a narrative of social justice. ''The Guardian'' highlighted her curatorial approach as an alternative to Hollywood-centric narratives of Los Angeles youth culture.

==== Laura Aguilar: Show and Tell (2017–2020) ====
Under her tenure, the museum presented ''Laura Aguilar: Show and Tell'', the first comprehensive retrospective of the photographer’s work. The exhibition toured nationally for four years, concluding at the Leslie-Lohman Museum of Art.

==== A Decolonial Atlas (2017–2018) ====
She curated ''A Decolonial Atlas: Strategies in Contemporary Art of the Americas'', which originated at VPAM and traveled to Tufts University Art Galleries.

==== Sonic Terrains in Latinx Art (2022) ====
In 2022, Tompkins Rivas co-organized ''Sonic Terrains in Latinx Art'', a large-scale exhibition examining sound in Latinx and Latin American art. The show featured more than 30 artists, including Guillermo Galindo, Pauline Oliveros, Raphael Montañez Ortiz, Raven Chacon, Nervous Gender, and the Sonic Insurgency Research Group.

=== Lucas Museum of Narrative Art ===
From 2020 to 2025, Tompkins Rivas served as Chief Curator and Deputy Director of Curatorial & Collections at the Lucas Museum of Narrative Art. In this role, she worked closely with the museum’s founders, filmmaker George Lucas and business leader Mellody Hobson, helping to shape the institution’s curatorial vision, acquisitions strategy, and inaugural exhibitions.

She played a central role in establishing the museum’s curatorial and collections infrastructure, including the development of inaugural exhibitions, the design of 100,000 square feet of gallery space, and the stewardship of a 140,000-object collection.

Under her tenure, the museum expanded its acquisitions to include works by Frida Kahlo, Robert Colescott, Alice Neel, Artemisia Gentileschi, and Criselda Vásquez, among others.

== Curatorial work and Selected Exhibitions ==
Tompkins Rivas’s curatorial practice centers on visibility, belonging, youth culture, decoloniality, and the intersections of identity, community, and narrative.

Her exhibitions have been presented in the United States, Mexico, Colombia, France, Egypt, and Italy.

Selected exhibitions

- Inaugural Exhibitions, Lucas Museum of Narrative Art (forthcoming 2026)
- You Belong Here: Place, People, and Purpose in Latinx Photography, Princeton University Art Museum; Michael C. Carlos Museum (2023)
- Sonic Terrains in Latinx Art, Vincent Price Art Museum (2022)
- Liquid Light, Vincent Price Art Museum (2021–2022)
- Frieze Projects, Frieze Los Angeles (2020)
- Gabriela Ruiz: Full of Tears, Vincent Price Art Museum (2019–2020)
- Carolina Caycedo: Apariciones / Apparitions, Vincent Price Art Museum (2019–2020)
- Umar Rashid: The World You Know Is a Fiction, Vincent Price Art Museum (2019–2020)
- Regeneración: Three Generations of Revolutionary Ideology, Vincent Price Art Museum (2018–2019)
- Guadalupe Rosales: Echoes of a Collective Memory, Vincent Price Art Museum (2018–2019)
- Laura Aguilar: Show and Tell, VPAM; Frost Art Museum; National Museum of Mexican Art; Leslie-Lohman Museum of Art (2017–2020)
- Home—So Different, So Appealing, LACMA; Museum of Fine Arts, Houston (2017–2018)
- A Universal History of Infamy, LACMA; Charles White Elementary; 18th Street Arts Center (2017–2018)
- Tastemakers & Earthshakers, Vincent Price Art Museum (2016–2017)
- A Decolonial Atlas, VPAM; Tufts University; Union College; Cairo Biennial; Oficina de Proyectos Culturales (2015–2019)
- Asco and Friends: Exiled Portraits, Triangle France (2014)
- Bas Jan Ader: Suspended Between Laughter and Tears, Pitzer College Art Galleries; Museo de Arte Zapopan (2010–2011)
- Vexing: Female Voices from East LA Punk, Claremont Museum of Art; Museo de las Artes, Guadalajara (2008–2010)
- MexiCali Biennial, Mexicali and Los Angeles (2006)

Tompkins Rivas co-curated the exhibition Forêt Intérieure/Interior Forest with artist Alexandra Grant at the 18th Street Arts Center in Santa Monica in 2013. Conceived as a participatory, community-based project inspired by the writings of Hélène Cixous, the exhibition featured large-scale drawings, public programs, and collaborative installations. A second iteration of the project, presented by Grant, was mounted later that year at Mains d’Oeuvres, an arts center in Saint-Ouen, outside Paris. The accompanying publication, co-edited by Tompkins Rivas, documented both phases of the exhibition and included essays by Grant, Cixous, Tompkins Rivas, and Robert Nashak.

== Publications ==
Aperture “Latinx” issue and national exhibition tour

In 2021, Tompkins Rivas served as Guest Editor of Latinx, Issue 245 of Aperture magazine, a landmark publication examining more than a century of image-making by Latinx photographers and artists. The issue brought together portfolios, essays, and archival materials that foregrounded the role of personal, vernacular, and community-based photography in shaping Latinx visual culture. In her introduction, Tompkins Rivas emphasized the importance of family and personal archives in documenting histories often absent from mainstream institutions, noting that the first images that came to mind were “the personal photographs that have helped me piece together the story of my family’s history as Latinos in the United States.”

The issue received significant critical attention. Writing in the Los Angeles Times, columnist Carolina A. Miranda compared its impact to the influential 1990 exhibition Chicano Art: Resistance and Affirmation (CARA), describing Latinx as “a thoughtful introduction to photography by Latino artists — a place to start looking into histories that have been neglected.”

Following the publication, Tompkins Rivas organized a related exhibition, You Belong Here: Place, People, and Purpose in Latinx Photography, which toured nationally for several years. The exhibition opened at the Princeton University Art Museum in 2023 and later traveled to the Michael C. Carlos Museum at Emory University. Featuring works by artists such as Guadalupe Rosales, Hiram Maristany, Reynaldo Rivera, Laura Aguilar, and John M. Valadez, the exhibition expanded on themes introduced in the Aperture issue, highlighting the centrality of Latinx photographers in documenting community histories, cultural identity, and everyday life.

=== Selected Publications ===
- Latinx, *Aperture Magazine*, Issue 245 (Guest Editor), 2021
- Yolanda González: Sueño de Familia / Dream of Family, VPAM, 2020 (Editor; essay)
- Dialogues in Time: Charting Genealogies and Intersections of Gender, ArtBo, 2018 (Author)
- Regeneración: Three Generations of Revolutionary Ideology, VPAM, 2018 (Editor; essay)
- Home—So Different, So Appealing, LACMA; MFA Houston; UCLA CSRC, 2017 (Co‑editor; essay)
- A Universal History of Infamy, LACMA, 2017 (Co‑editor; essay)
- Forêt Intérieure/Interior Forest, 18th Street Arts Center, 2016 (Co‑editor; essay)
- 18th Street Arts Center 2012–2013, 18th Street Arts Center, 2014 (Editor; essay)
- L.A. Xicano, UCLA CSRC, 2011 (Co‑editor; essay);

Winner, 2012 Independent Publisher Book Awards, Gold Medal, West-Pacific Best Regional Non-fiction Winner, 2012 international Latino Book Awards, 1st Place, Best Art Books (English)

- Bas Jan Ader: Suspended Between Laughter and Tears, Pitzer College Art Galleries, 2010 (Editor; essay)
- Vexing: Female Voices from East L.A. Punk, Claremont Museum of Art, 2008 (Co‑editor; essay)
- MexiCali Biennial, 2006 (Texts)

=== Publication Management ===
- Laura Aguilar: Show and Tell, VPAM and UCLA CSRC, 2017 (Foreword; publication management)

 - Winner, Independent Publisher Book Awards (Gold Medal)  
 - Winner, International Latino Book Awards

== Media and film appearances ==
Tompkins Rivas has appeared in several film and television programs, including:

- ASCO: Without Permission (2025) — Self
- Artbound (2022) — Consulting Producer
- Modern Art Blitz (2016) — Guest

== Speaking engagements ==
- Museum of Modern Art (MoMA)
- Princeton University Art Museum
- Michael C. Carlos Museum
- Aperture Foundation
- Getty Research Institute — “Imaginaries of LA: Guadalupe Rosales and Pilar Tompkins Rivas” (2021)
- Getty Villa — “Picture Worlds: Storytelling on Greek, Maya and Moche Pottery” (2024)
- Los Angeles County Museum of Art — “Celebrating the History of Murals in Los Angeles with Judy Baca,” with Michael Govan and Pilar Tompkins Rivas (2024)
- University of Texas at Austin (Commencement Address, 2022)
