= Manuel López =

Manuel López may refer to:

== Footballers ==
- Travieso (footballer) (Manuel López Llamosas, 1900–1975), Spanish football forward
- Manuel López (Chilean footballer) (born 1972), Chilean football defender
- Manuel López Mondragón (born 1983), Mexican football defender
- Manolo (footballer, born 1985) (Manuel López Escámez), Spanish football midfielder
- Manuel López (Guatemalan footballer) (born 1990), Guatemalan defender
- Manuel López (Argentine footballer) (born 1995), Argentine football forward

== Others ==
- Manuel López (boxer) (1929–1954), Argentine lightweight Olympian
- Manuel López Ochoa (1933–2011), Mexican actor
- Manuel López Oliva (born 1947), Cuban painter and art curator
- Manuel López Villarreal (born 1958), Mexican politician
- Manuel López (artist) (born 1983), American educator
- Manuel Lopez (politician), represented Philippines's 8th senatorial district 1916–1919

== See also ==
- Manuel Lopes (disambiguation)
- Manny Lopez (disambiguation)
