= Alberto Valdés =

Alberto Valdés may refer to:

- Alberto Valdés (equestrian, born 1919) (1919–2013), Mexican equestrian
- Alberto Valdés Jr. (1950–2020), his son, Mexican equestrian
- Alberto Valdés (painter) (1918–1998), Mexican-American artist
