= Terriquez =

Terriquez is a surname. Notable people with the surname include:

- Damian Terriquez (born 1998), American actor
- Veronica Terriquez (born 1971/1972), Chicana sociologist, professor, and activist
- Ernesto Terríquez Sámano (born 1938), Mexican historian and politician
