= Alberto Ríos =

American poet (born 1952)

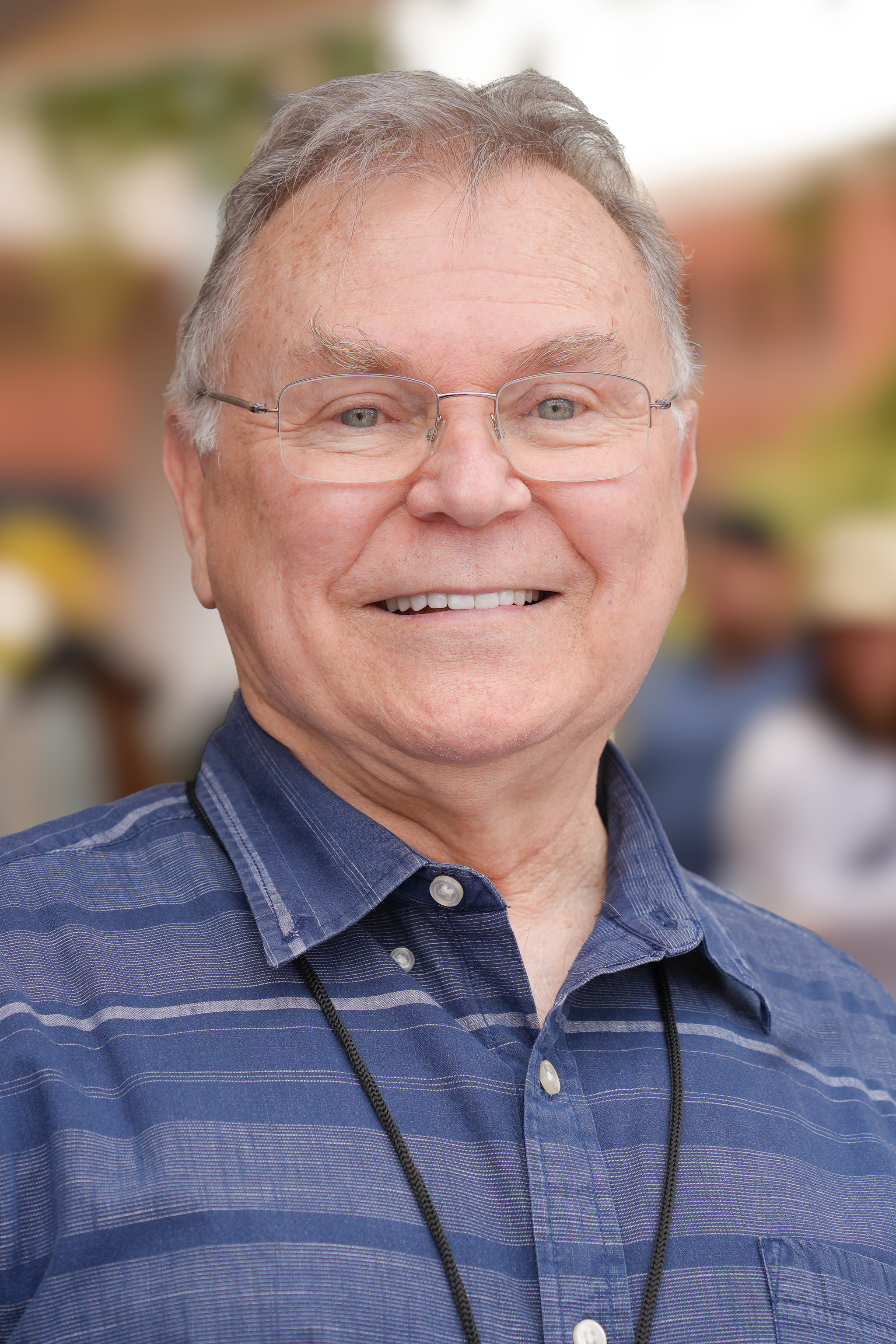
- Ríos at the 2026 Tucson Festival of Books
- Born: September 18, 1952 (age 73); Nogales, Arizona
- Occupations: Professor, poet
- Writing career
- Genre: Poetry

Alberto Álvaro Ríos (born September 18, 1952) is a US academic and writer who is the author of ten books and chapbooks of poetry, three collections of short stories, and a memoir.

Rios was named Arizona's first state poet laureate in August 2013, a position he continues to hold.

== Life ==
Alberto Ríos graduated from University of Arizona with an MFA. He is a Regents' Professor at Arizona State University, where he has taught since 1982 and where he holds the further distinction of the Katharine C. Turner Endowed Chair in English.

His book A Small Story About the Sky was published in 2015 by Copper Canyon Press. Other books of poems include The Dangerous Shirt, along with The Theater of Night, winner of the 2007 PEN/Beyond Margins Award, The Smallest Muscle in the Human Body, finalist for the National Book Award, Teodoro Luna's Two Kisses, The Lime Orchard Woman, The Warrington Poems, Five Indiscretions, and Whispering to Fool the Wind, which won the Walt Whitman Award.

His three collections of short stories are The Curtain of Trees, Pig Cookies and The Iguana Killer, which won the first Western States Book Award for Fiction, judged by Robert Penn Warren.

His memoir about growing up on the Mexico-Arizona border, called Capirotada, won the Latino Literary Hall of Fame Award and was designated the OneBookArizona choice for 2009.

Ríos is the recipient of the Western Literature Association Distinguished Achievement Award, the Arizona Governor's Arts Award, fellowships from the Guggenheim Foundation and the National Endowment for the Arts, the Walt Whitman Award, the Western States Book Award for Fiction, six Pushcart Prizes in both poetry and fiction, and inclusion in The Norton Anthology of Modern Poetry.

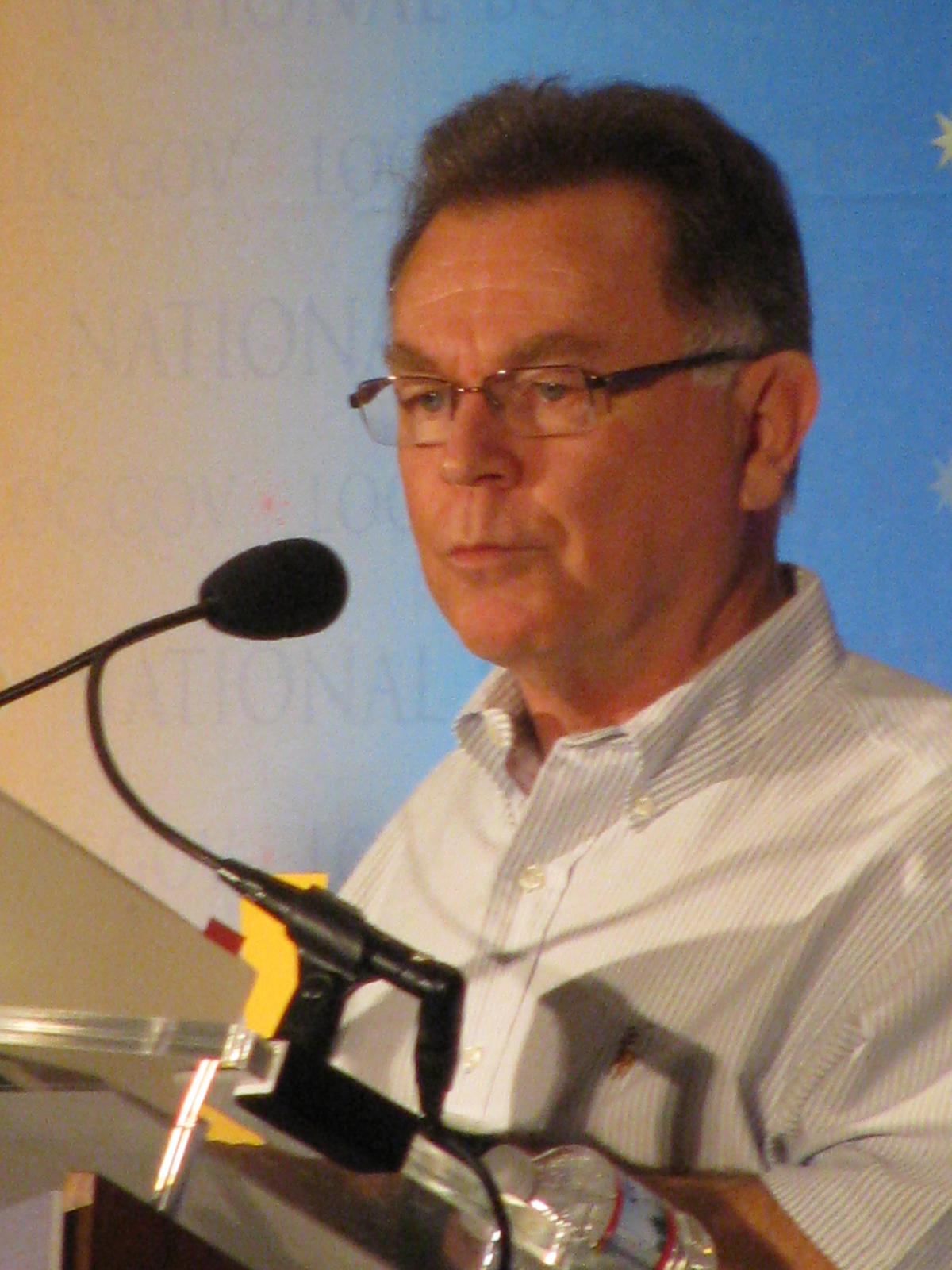
Ríos at the 2014 National Book Festival

In 2014, he was elected a Chancellor of the Academy of American Poets.

Ríos is also a host for ASU's Walter Cronkite School of Journalism and Mass Communication's KAET. He hosted the litereray interview show Books & Co. from 2009 to 2018. He currently hosts the arts interview show Art in the 48.

== Bibliography ==
=== Poetry ===
His books of poems include:

- A Small Story About the Sky, Copper Canyon Press, 2015, ISBN 9781556594793
- Alberto Ríos (2009). The Dangerous Shirt. Copper Canyon Press. ISBN 978-1-55659-298-0.
- The Theater of Night, Copper Canyon Press, 2006, ISBN 9781556592591
- The Smallest Muscle in the Human Body. Copper Canyon Press. 5 April 2014. pp. 106–. ISBN 978-1-61932-123-6. nominated for the National Book Award,
- Teodoro Luna's Two Kisses W. W. Norton, Incorporated, 1992, ISBN 9780393308099
- The Lime Orchard Woman Sheep Meadow Press, 1988, ISBN 9780935296778
- The Warrington Poems, Pyracantha Press, Arizona State University, School of Art, 1989
- Five Indiscretions The Sheep Meadow Press, 1985, ISBN 9780935296570
- Whispering to Fool the Wind, Sheep Meadow Press, 1982, ISBN 9780935296303
- Sleeping on Fists (Dooryard Press, 1981)
- Elk Heads on the Wall(Mango Publications, 1979)
- Spring in the Only Place Spring Was

=== Short story collections ===
- The Curtain of Trees
- Pig Cookies
- The Iguana Killer: Twelve Stories of the Heart. UNM Press. 1984. ISBN 978-0-8263-1922-7.
- The Secret Lion

=== Non-fiction ===
- Capirotada, University of New México Press, 1999, ISBN 9780826320940, a memoir about growing up on the Mexican border

== Honors ==
- Guggenheim Foundation fellowship
- National Endowment for the Arts fellowship
- Walt Whitman Award
- Outstanding Latino/a Cultural Award in Literary Arts or Publications, American Association of Hispanics in Higher Education (AAHHE), 2004
- Western States Book Award for fiction
- Pushcart Prize - awarded 6 times for both poetry and fiction
- 2005 Arizona Historymaker selection by the Arizona Historical League
- 2007 recipient of the PEN/Beyond Margins Award for The Theater of Night
