= Edgar Fabián Frías =

American interdisciplinary artist

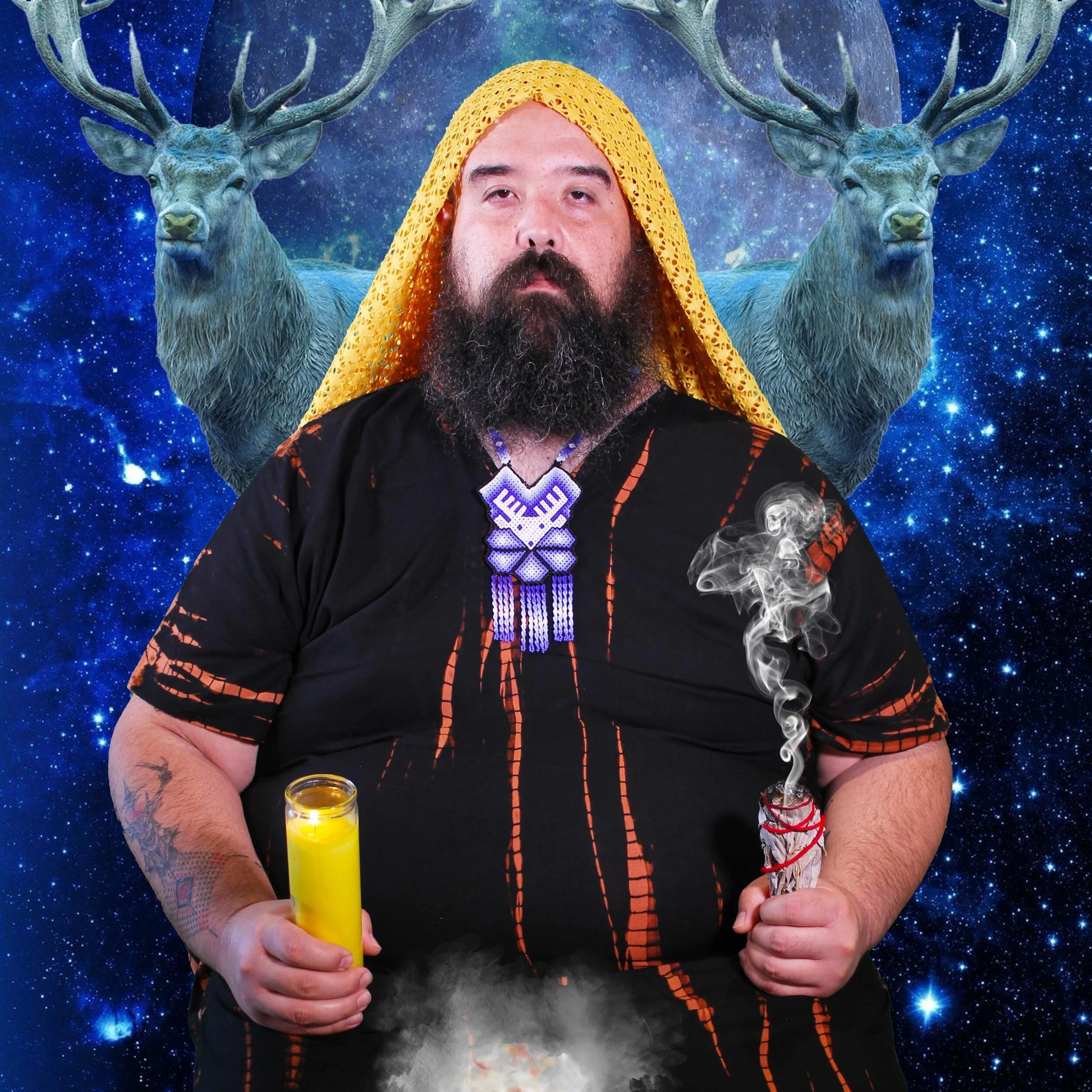
- Born: 1983 (age 42–43); Huntington Park, California, United States
- Education: (BA) University of California, Riverside, (M.A.) Portland State University (M.F.A) University of California, Berkeley
- Known for: Multidisciplinary art practice, Indigenous futurism, Queer identity, Digital media
- Notable work: Givenchy Beauty Pride Gallery (2023), Arch Lunar Art Archive (2024), Vessel Installation (2024)
- Website: www.edgarfabianfrias.org

Edgar Fabián Frías is an American interdisciplinary artist based in Los Angeles. Their practice spans video, performance, new media, and social practice, and often addresses the intersections of Indigeneity, queer identity, mysticism, and psychological healing. Critics have noted that Frías’s projects merge ritual, therapy, and community participation as ways of exploring transformation and collective care.

== Education ==
Frías earned a Bachelor of Arts in Psychology and Studio Art from the University of California, Riverside, a Master of Arts in Clinical Mental Health Counseling from Portland State University, and a Master of Fine Arts in Art Practice from the University of California, Berkeley. Their training in psychology informs their use of art as a tool for introspection and healing.

== Career ==
Frías began exhibiting in the early 2010s, developing a multidisciplinary approach that integrates performance, video, and digital media. Their work has been shown at Machine Project, Human Resources Los Angeles, Angel’s Gate Cultural Center, and the Gilcrease Museum. They have also been recognized in digital art contexts for their experimentation with online media and GIF-based storytelling.

In 2019, Frías presented their first solo museum exhibition, Perpetual Flowering, at the Vincent Price Art Museum in Los Angeles. The installation combined digital imagery, video, and sacred objects to examine healing and queer Indigenous spirituality. The following year, they exhibited Nierika: Santuario Somático at Oregon Contemporary in Portland. The work, informed by Frías’s Wixárika heritage, explored the concept of the Nierika, a spiritual portal linking material and divine worlds. The installation combined ready-made objects, video, and participatory rituals to consider hybrid spirituality and embodied healing.

Frías’s large-scale projection work has appeared on the Salesforce Tower in San Francisco as part of a public art initiative organized by the Berkeley Center for New Media. Their work has also been highlighted in Bold Journey and other cultural publications for their interdisciplinary practice and engagement with digital spirituality.

They have participated in exhibitions and projects at major institutions, including the Los Angeles County Museum of Art (LACMA), where Frías led the “Another World Performance Workshop” in 2023 as part of the museum’s public art programming. They also participated in Getty’s PST ART initiative in Joshua Tree in 2024.

In 2024, Frías was one of 135 contemporary artists selected to have their artwork included in the Arch Lunar Art Archive, an initiative organized by the Arch Mission Foundation that was etched onto nickel nanofiche and delivered to the moon aboard the Odysseus Lander. In 2023, they were one of three LGBTQIA+ digital artists commissioned by Givenchy Beauty to create artwork for the virtual Givenchy Beauty Pride Gallery.

In addition to visual art, Frías works with astrology and tarot as part of their spiritual and community practice. They have been featured in national and cultural media discussing how these practices intersect with queer and Latinx identity. Frías’s writing has appeared in anthologies such as WITCH: An Anthology and A Confluence of Witches, and Dopamine Press' WITCH Anthology, and they have been discussed in academic and critical publications for their contributions to community-based and ritual art practices.

From 2019 to 2020, Frías served as Public Research Fellow on Play at the Oklahoma Center for the Humanities at the University of Tulsa, where they examined performative and communal aspects of play and ritual.

Frías has served on the board of UCLA's Archive of Healing, a digital repository of traditional medicine and cultural healing modalities, since 2021.

Frías identifies as non-binary and works as a licensed psychotherapist in California, integrating counseling and creative practice in their work.

== Selected exhibitions ==
=== Selected solo exhibitions ===
- 2024. Vessel, Los Angeles County Department of Arts and Culture, (Los Angeles, CA)
- 2024. Museum of Multidimensional Mutant Maps, Philosophical Research Society, curated by Katie Peyton Hofstadter (Los Angeles, CA)
- 2020. Nierika: Santuario Somático, Oregon Contemporary, curated by Justin Hoover, (Portland, OR)
- 2019. Perpetual Flowering, Vincent Price Art Museum, curated by Pilar Tompkins Rivas (Los Angeles, CA)

=== Selected group exhibitions ===
- 2026. A Queer Arcana: Art, Magic, and Spirit, Palm Springs Art Museum, curated by David Evans Frantz (Palm Springs, CA)
- 2026. Holding A Bright Untroubled Sky: Visioning A Better World Through Magic, Rowe Galleries, University of North Carolina, Charlotte, curated by Amy Hale (Charlotte, NC)
- 2025. Dieu est Algorithme, Plateforme, curated by Rolando J Carmona (Paris, France)
- 2024. Desert Forest: Life With Joshua Trees, Lancaster Museum of Art and History, curated by Juniper Harrower & Sant Khalsa (Lancaster, CA)
- 2024. SUMMERTIME, Brand Library and Art Center, curated by Marcela Vieira (Glendale, CA)
- 2024. Arch Lunar Art Archive, Arch Mission Foundation, curated by Ian Stanton (The Moon)
- 2023. Givenchy Beauty Pride Gallery, Spatial, (New York, NY)
- 2022. Mexicali Biennial: Land of Milk and Honey, The Cheech Marin Center for Chicano Art & Culture, curated by Ed Gomez, Luis Guillermo Hernandez, and Rosalía Romero.

=== List of selected exhibitions and projects at University of California, Berkeley ===
- When Things Get Back to Normal, Worth Ryder Art Gallery
- MFA Open Studios 2022, Richmond Field Station
- Artist Talks: The 52nd UC Berkeley MFA Show, BAMPFA Osher Theater
- 52nd MFA Thesis Show, Berkeley Art Museum and Pacific Film Archive (BAMPFA)
- Critical Data Futures Colloquium, BAMPFA
- More Than Meets AI, Worth Ryder Art Gallery
