= Laura Aguilar =

American photographer (1959–2018)

- Born: October 26, 1959; San Gabriel, California, U.S.
- Died: April 25, 2018 (aged 58); Long Beach, California, U.S.
- Occupation: Photographer
- Notable work: Three Eagles Flying; The Plush Pony Series; Clothed/Unclothed

Laura Aguilar (October 26, 1959 – April 25, 2018) was an American photographer. She was born with auditory dyslexia and attributed her start in photography to her brother, who showed her how to develop in dark rooms. She was mostly self-taught, although she took some photography courses at East Los Angeles College, where her second solo exhibition, Laura Aguilar: Show and Tell, was held.

Aguilar used visual art to bring forth marginalized identities, especially within the LA Queer scene and Latinx communities. Before the term Intersectionality was used commonly, Aguilar captured the largely invisible identities of large bodied, queer, working-class, brown people in the form of portraits. Often using her naked body as a subject, she used photography to empower herself and her inner struggles to reclaim her own identity as "Laura" – a lesbian, fat, disabled, and brown person. Although work on Chicana/os is limited, Aguilar has become an essential figure in Chicano art history and is often regarded as an early "pioneer of intersectional feminism" for her outright and uncensored work. Some of her most well-known works are Three Eagles Flying, The Plush Pony Series, and Nature Self Portraits. Aguilar has been noted for her collaboration with cultural scholars such as Yvonne Yarbo-Berjano and receiving inspiration from other artists like Judy Dater. She was well known for her portraits, mostly of herself, and also focused upon people in marginalized communities, including LGBT and Latino subjects, self-love, and social stigma of obesity.

== Biography ==
Aguilar was the daughter of a first-generation Mexican-American father. Her mother is of mixed Mexican and Irish heritage. She had auditory dyslexia and developed an early interest in photography as a medium. She attended Schurr High School in Montebello, California. In 1977, during a high school photography class, she met Gil Cuadros, a Mexican-American poet who was diagnosed with AIDS. Cuadros would accompany Aguilar to Downtown Los Angeles for pictures.

Aguilar was active as a photographer beginning in the 1980s. She was mainly self-taught, although she studied for a time at East Los Angeles Community College and participated in The Friends of Photography Workshop and Santa Fe Photographic Workshop.

Aguilar worked primarily in the genre of portraiture. Her work centers on the human form and challenges contemporary social constructs of beauty, focusing upon Latina lesbians, black people, and the fat. According to critics, she often used self-portraiture to come to terms with her own body as she challenged societal norms of sexuality, class, gender, and race. In her series Stillness (1996–99), Motion (1999) and Center (2001), she, according to critics, fused portraiture with the genres of landscape and still life. Aguilar stated that her artistic goal was "to create photographic images that compassionately render the human experience, revealed through the lives of individuals in the lesbian/gay and/or persons of color communities."

Aguilar's works have appeared in more than 50 national and international exhibitions, including the 1993 Venice Biennial, Italy; the Los Angeles City Hall Bridge Gallery, the Los Angeles Contemporary Exhibitions (LACE), the Los Angeles Photography Center, the Women's Center Gallery at the University of California, Santa Barbara, and Artpace's exhibit Visibilities: Intrepid Women of Artpace. She was a 2000 recipient of an Anonymous Was A Woman Award and the James D. Phelan Award in photography in 1995.

She had her first retrospective, Laura Aguilar: Show and Tell, at the Vincent Price Art Museum at East Los Angeles College as part of the Pacific Standard Time LA/LA series of exhibitions in 2017–18. The exhibition also made stops in Miami, FL at the Frost Art Museum and the National Museum of Mexican Art in Chicago, IL. It opened at the Leslie-Lohman Museum of Art in New York in spring 2021.

In 2024, Aguilar's work was include in Xican-a.o.x. Body a comprehensive group exhibition narrating stories about Chicano experience and art histories, spanning works from the 1960s to the present day and showcasing a myriad of artistic languages. The show traveled from the Cheech Marin Center for Chicano Art & Culture of the Riverside Art Museum, California, to the Pérez Art Museum Miami, Florida. An accompanying publication was released by The University of Chicago Press.

=== Death ===
Aguilar died of complications from diabetes in a Long Beach, California nursing home, Colonial Care Center, at the age of 58.

== Collections ==
Her work is held in a number of public collections, including those at the Kinsey Institute for Research in Sex, Gender, and Reproduction, Indiana University, Bloomington; Los Angeles County Museum of Art; Museum of Contemporary Art, Los Angeles; Whitney Museum of American Art, New York City; and the New Museum of Contemporary Art, New York City.

== Works ==
Nudes and Self Portraits Much of Aguilar's work is self-portraiture in the nude, these series include Stillness, Window (Nikki on My Mind), Motion, Grounded, Center and Nature Self-Portraits

=== Nudes in Nature ===
Much of Aguilar's work uses the nude female form being blended into different landscapes. Some of her most notable pieces such as Nature Self-Portraits, Grounded, and Center "fuse" female bodies into desert landscapes as "an integral part of [the] ecosystem". In 1996, Aguilar and fellow photographer, Delilah Montoya created the series of nudes in nature titled Nature Self-Portraits "on a road trip through New Mexico" where Aguilar found herself pushing the boundaries of her art. Not only were the subject's nude, but they were large-bodied and brown- bodies that art historians state "would have never been included in modernists photography". Subjects reflected the shape of rocks, trees, and water making their body a part of the land. Through the "projection of her body", Aguilar forces viewers to acknowledge her and rejects the "parameters of what is accepted as...normal, appealing", and "attractive". By placing herself out front in nature, the viewer is asked to see her body for its beauty outside of conventional standards. Scholars contend that Aguilar "challenges the idea of the female nude-one of the most important genres in western art" by using atypical bodies. The desert, specifically the San Gabriel Valley, represented a homeland for Aguilar stating, "My mom grew up here...my grandmother grew up here, This was my playground". Aguilar's self-acceptance in nature came from her sense of connection to the land. Curator Pilar Thompkins Rivas reflected on the relationship between Aguilar and the outdoors stating "feeling the sun on her body was important to her...because she did noy get a lot of touch in her life". This interaction between subject and landscape opens up different context and "new subjectivity" for Chicana/os to be represented in.

Clothed/ Unclothed Series (1990-1994) A series of diptychs depicting a range of subjects including people from LGBT, straight, Latino and black communities. The first photograph shows the subjects clothed and the second unclothed.

In Sandy's Room 1989 is a self-portrait. It shows Laura laying back in a chair in front of an open window.

Three Eagles Flying 1990 is a triptych. At the center, Aguilar is bound by ropes with the Mexican flag wrapped around her head and the American flag wrapped around her hips. The eagle of the Mexican flag covers her face. The panel on her left is a photo of the Mexican flag and on her right is the American flag.

Latina Lesbian Series 1986-1990 is a series of black and white portraits of lesbian women mostly commissioned by Yolanda Retter sponsored by Connexxus. Underneath each portrait are handwritten notes from the women in the photos. This series challenged the stereotypes that queer/lesbian Chicana women faced. In this series, Aguilar includes her self-portrait titled Laura 1998. A black and white photograph of a grinning Laura Aguilar standing in a room with her hands in her pockets. She is wearing a cowboy hat, a striped polo shirt, short, ankle socks, and sneakers. Framing the photographs are 20 different black and white lotería cards. Under the frame there is a handwritten message in black ink. It reads, "Im not comfortable with the word Lesbian but as each day go’s by I’m more and more comfortable with the word LAURA. I know some people see me as very child-like, naive. Maybe so. I am. But I will be damned if I let this part of me die!".

How Mexican is Mexican 1990 is a series of three black and white triptychs. Each triptych features a self-portrait of Aguilar alongside two other portraits of Chicana women. Similar to Aguilar's work in Latina Lesbians, each photograph included handwritten notes under the portraits of the women photographed. These series prompted the subjects to speak about their connection to their Mexican heritage.

Plush Pony Series 1992 is Aguilar's attempt to show all sides of the Latina Lesbian community. Aguilar set up in the East Los Angeles lesbian bar called The Plush Pony and took photographs of the patrons creating a series of black and white portraits of the lower working class community.

Aguilar turned the camera on herself after documenting the community she found herself in- the queer Latinx scene in East Los Angeles. It was the early 1990s when Aguilar alone took black and white portraits at a "lesbian bar in the Los Angeles Neighborhood of El Sereno" called the Plush Pony. The series was created in a "built in studio" in the bar showcasing a "range of butch/femme couples, gay men, gender-queer bodies, and combinations thereof" that made up the queer and immigrant community of Los Angeles.

Aguilar was an introvert and had a difficult time recruiting subjects stating, "I was nervous at first to talk to the women in the bar. They seemed tough", but her camera helped her get over this and connect with the social scene. Aguilar remarks that she "used [her] camera as way to approach people and as a way to get over my hesitation" resulting in lifelong friendships between herself and her subjects. This work differed from the brown and queer photographic archive of the time because the relationship between artists and subject was blurred. Aguilar was not documenting marginalized people but was instead capturing the life of her community. From this perspective, Aguilar captures the varying compositions of "pleasure, community and friendship" though the lens of gender, race, sexuality, and class. Like the Latina Lesbian series (1985-1991), the Plush Pony series became an expression and "living documentation of queer brown networks".

Will Work For 1993 a black and white self portrait series of Aguilar standing in front of different galleries holding up a cardboard sign. The sign reads "Artist Will Work For Axcess" in handwritten text.

== Critical reception ==
Critics and scholars closely identify Aguilar's work with Chicana feminism; one writer observes that "Aguilar consciously moves away from the societally normative images of Chicana female bodies and disassociates them from male-centered nostalgia or idealizations." Chon A. Noriega, director of the UCLA Chicano Studies Research Center, notes that Aguilar is unusual for the way she "collaborates with subjects who are her peers so that her works are not about power differentials between photographer and subject as is often, if implicitly the case with ... the social documentary tradition itself". In referencing Aguilar's work Three Eagles Flying, Charlene Villasenor Black, a professor at UCLA who teaches Aguilar's work in both her art history and Chicanx studies courses, says, "[Aguilar] challenges the idea of the female nude—one of the most important genres in Western art—as the passive object of the male gaze. It's very clear that she's aware of the tradition, and she's able to repeat certain elements from the canon in such a way that shows us how unstable that meaning is and to question these essentialized ideas about women." Her more recent self-portraits, according to critics, navigate her personal intersection of identities as Latina, lesbian, dyslexic, and fat. Her best-known series is often considered to be Latina Lesbians, (1986–89) which she started in order to help show a positive image of Latina lesbians for a mental health conference. Other popular works include Clothed/Unclothed (1990–94), Plush Pony (1992), and Grounded (2006–07), with the latter being her first body of work done in color. Reviewer A. M. Rousseau notes: "[Aguilar] makes public what is most private. By this risky act she transgresses familiar images of representation of the human body and replaces stereotypes with images of self-definition. She reclaims her body for herself."

== Impact ==
Some Latinx and Chicanx artists have shared their experiences with Aguilar's work. Working artists like Star Montana, José Villalobos, and Elle Pérez have all spoken admirably of Aguilar's work.

== See also ==
- Queer Chicano art
