= Outstanding Latino/a Cultural Award in Literary Arts or Publications =

Award for literary contributions to the Hispanic community

The Outstanding Latino/a Cultural Award in Literary Arts or Publications is one of several awards presented by the American Association of Hispanics in Higher Education, Inc. (AAHHE); it also sponsored by AT&T. The award is presented to Latinas/os whose literature, scholarship, and other publications have made significant contributions to the understanding of Hispanic community and/or culture.

The award is presented annually based on the author's achievements in fiction, non-fiction, and/or newspaper editing. Nominations are open, but the winners are selected by a committee of AAHHE Board members. Winners are recognized at the Annual AAHHE National Conference.

Recent winners include:

- 2020 Juan Felipe Herrera
- 2019 John A. Lopez
- 2018 Laurie Ann Guerrero
- 2017 Ana Castillo
- 2016 Juan Felipe Herrera
- 2015 Rolando Hinojosa-Smith
- 2014 Octavio Roca
- 2013 Benjamin Saenz
- 2012 Alma Flor Ada
- 2011 Chon Noriega
- 2010 Francisco Aragón
- 2009 Bessy Reyna
- 2008 Javier Ávila
- 2007 Helena Maria Viramontes
- 2006 Edward Gonzales
- 2005 Cordelia Chávez Candelaria
- 2004 Alberto Rios
- 2003 Rudolfo Anaya
- 2002 Juan Delgado
- 2001 Teófilo Jaime Chahín
- 1996 Nicholas Kanellos & Gary D. Keller
