= Alberto Valdés (painter) =

Mexican American artist

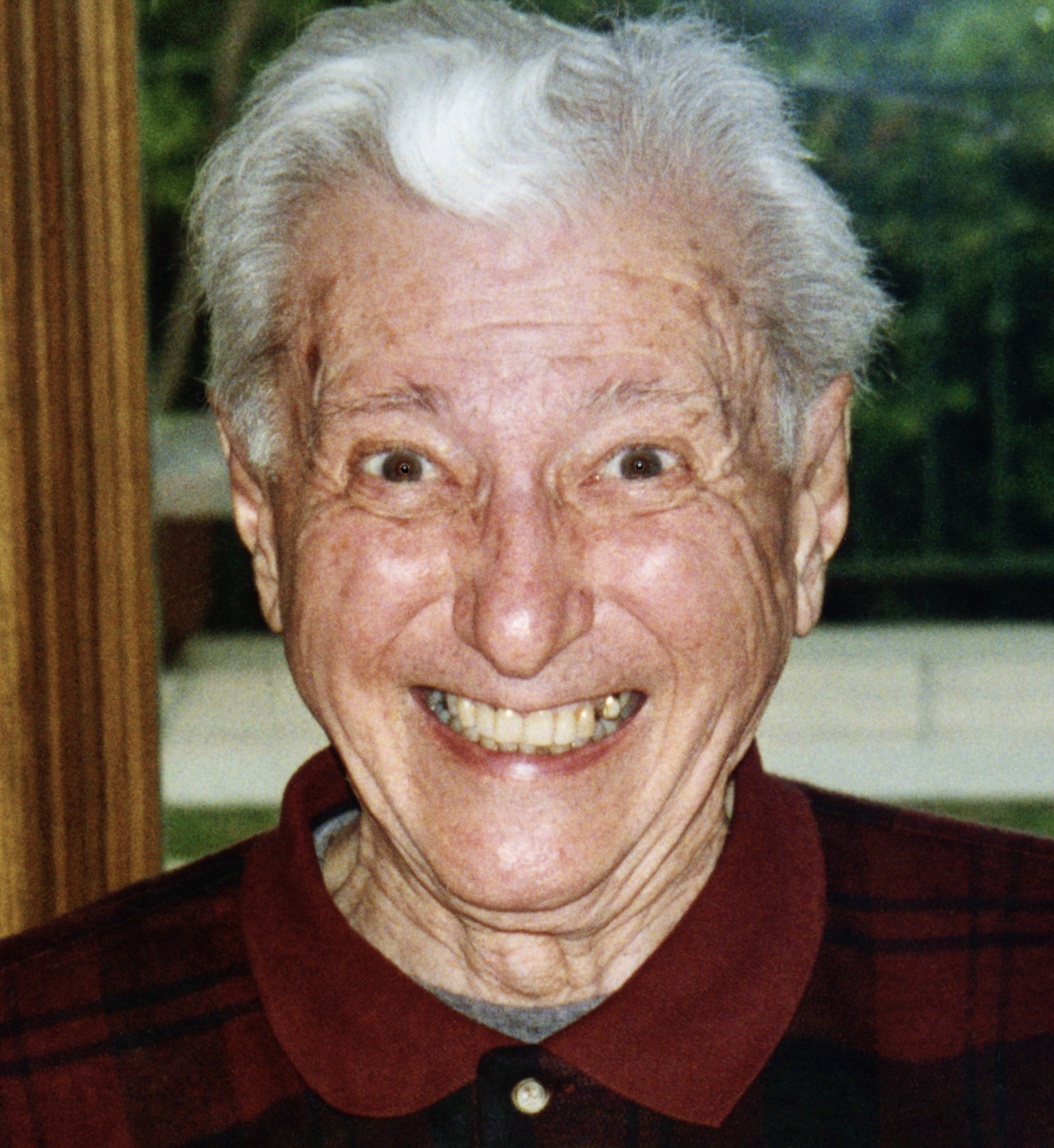
- Born: 28 March 1918; El Paso, Texas
- Died: 10 May 1998 (aged 80); Los Angeles, California
- Education: Harper's School of Art, Los Angeles; independent study
- Known for: Figurative abstract painting

Alberto Valdés (1918–1998) was a Mexican American artist known for his experimental approach, mastery of abstraction, and a profound dedication to the act of painting.

== Life ==
=== Early life and education ===
Valdés was born in El Paso, Texas, to Lydia Valdés and Alberto R. Valdés Sr., a composer and conductor of the Mexico City Philharmonic Orchestra. His parents had immigrated to the United States to escape the Mexican Revolution. He and his younger brother Armand were raised in the Boyle Heights neighborhood in East Los Angeles, home to a diverse mix of Mexican and Italian families.

Displaying a natural talent for art from an early age, Valdés graduated from Lincoln High School in 1936 and was awarded a scholarship to attend Harper's School of Art in Los Angeles. The award letter praised him, “His work is outstanding.... You should be proud of Mr. Valdés, for we have great faith in his ability.”

In his twenties, he worked as a commercial artist, producing magazine ads, billboard designs, and orange-crate labels.

=== Military Service ===
From 1941 to 1945, Valdés served as a communication chief in the United States Army during World War II in the European theater. He was awarded the Good Conduct Medal, American Campaign Medal and the European African Middle Eastern Campaign Medal.

=== Post-War Career ===
After returning from the war, Valdés was hired as an art designer at MGM Studios, where he worked on movie set designs until his retirement in the early 1960s.

=== Artistic Practice ===
Beginning in the 1960s, Valdés focused exclusively on his personal art. He worked only sporadically to support himself, choosing not to pursue a commercial or public artistic career.

He shifted from oil to acrylic paints to reduce drying time and support his prolific output. Often working in series, he painted multiple works simultaneously, moving freely between styles and genres.

Valdés pursued an independent artistic path outside of the established networks of Californian and Chicano art. He saw no need for external validation and declined to exhibit or sell his work during his lifetime.

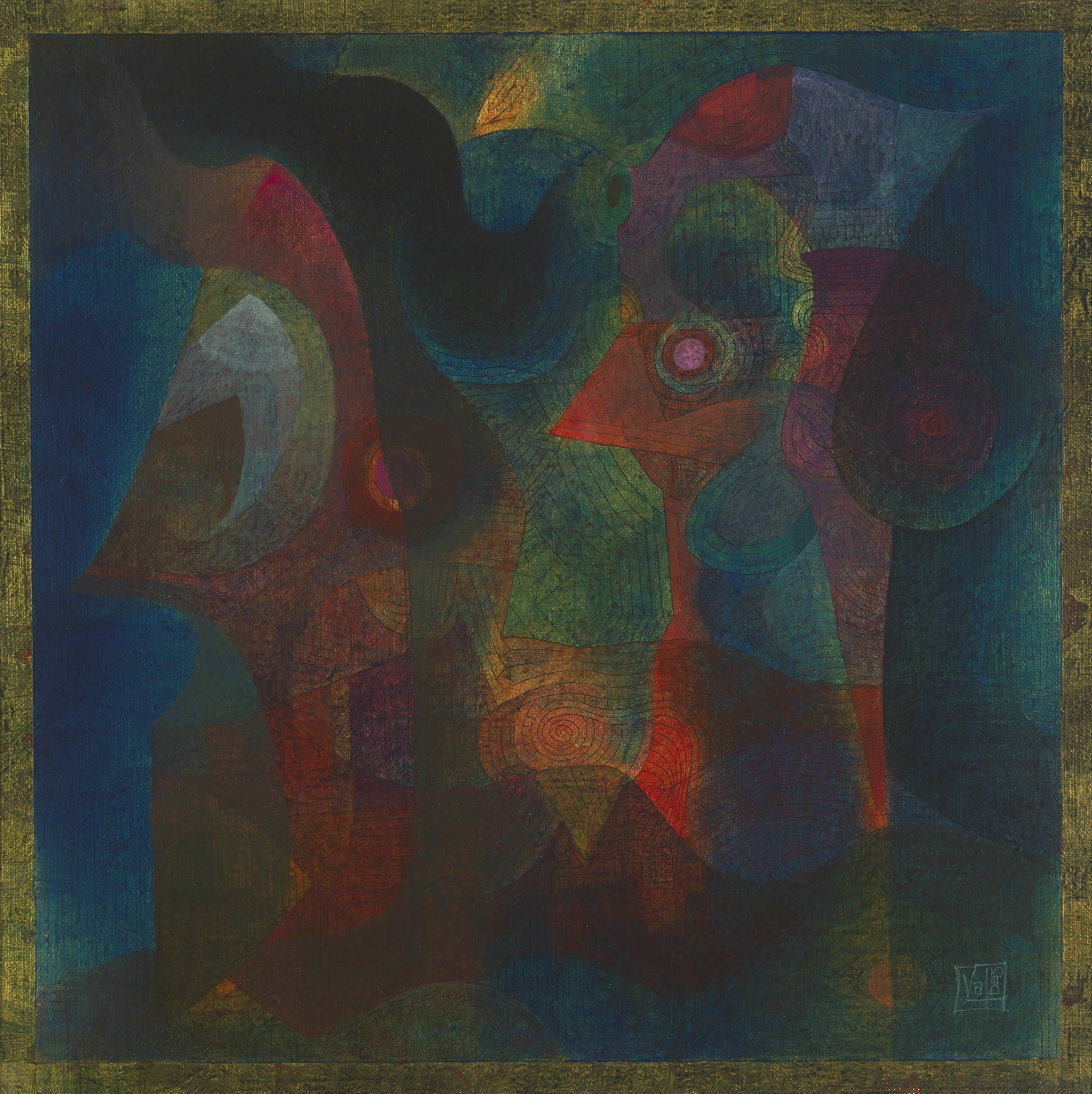
Alberto Valdés, Untitled, ca. 1965, Smithsonian American Art Museum

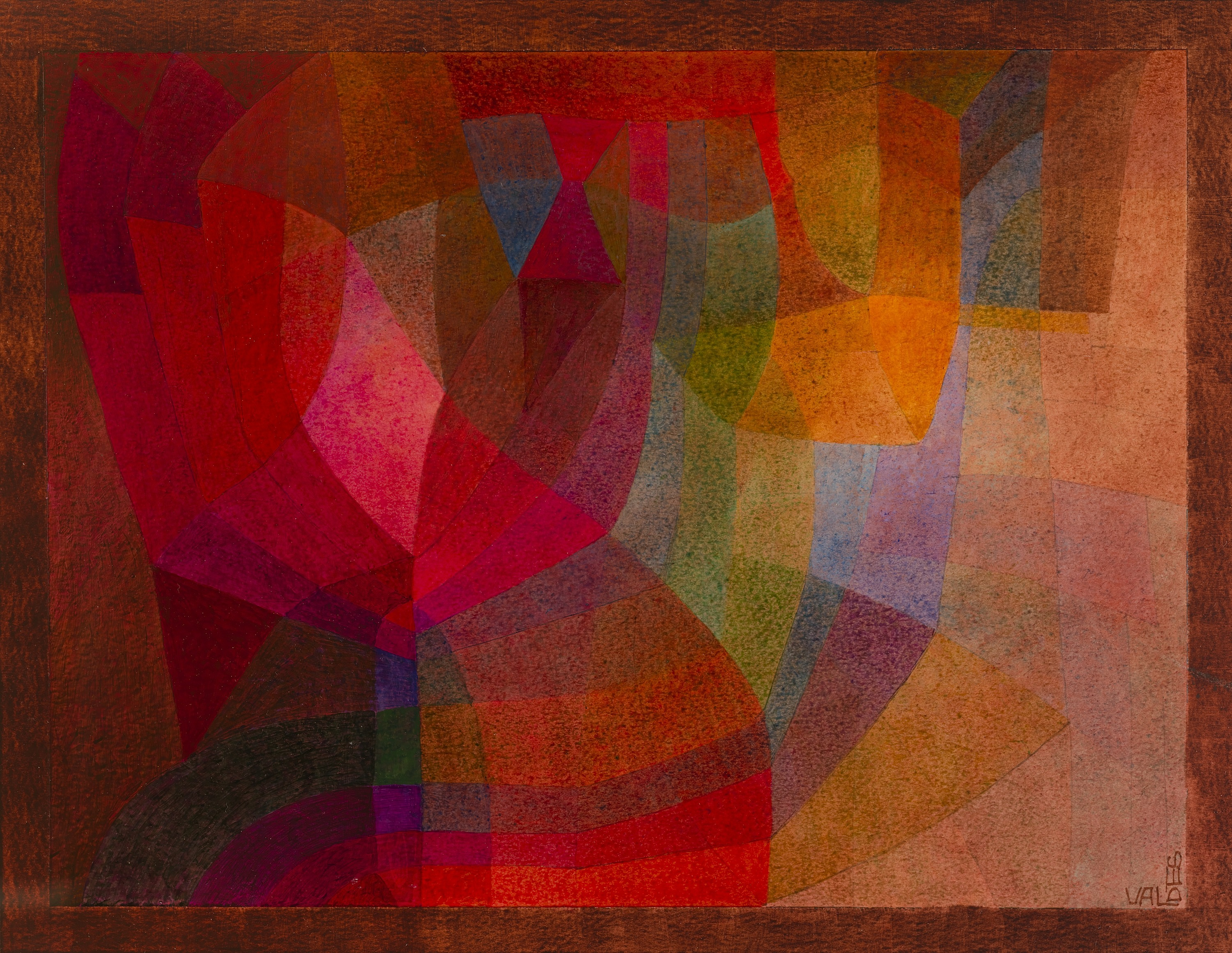
Alberto Valdés, Untitled, ca. 1960, acrylic on paper, Smithsonian American Art Museum

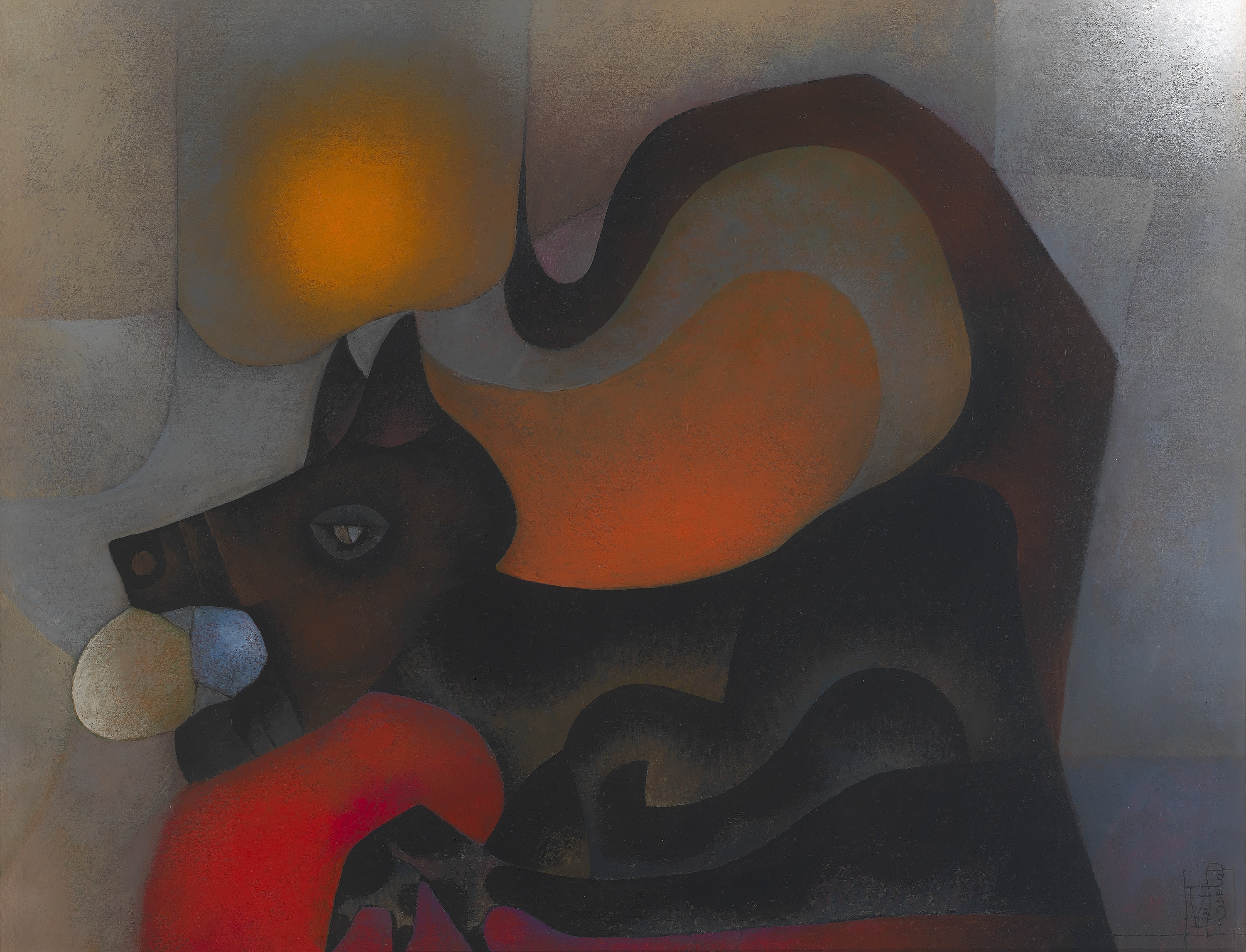
Alberto Valdés, Perro Cósmico for Summer, ca. 1981, acrylic on paper, Smithsonian American Art Museum

=== Influences ===
Largely self-directed in his artistic development, Valdés built an extensive personal library of art books and magazines, feeding his interest in global art movements. Deeply inspired by pre-Columbian and modern Mexican art, he felt a cultural and intellectual kinship with artists such as Rufino Tamayo and Ricardo Martinez. He also admired European masters including Caravaggio, Joan Miró, Pablo Picasso and Paul Klee.

=== "Mi arte es mi vida" ===
Valdés described a spiritual connection to painting and often said, “Mi arte es mi vida” (My art is my life).

He died in his home in Silver Lake, Los Angeles, on May 10, 1998, leaving behind hundreds of paintings and drawings.

== Posthumous Group Exhibitions ==
2011-2012 "Art Along the Hyphen: The Mexican American Generation", Autry National Center, Los Angeles. Eighteen paintings by Valdés were included in this group exhibition, organized by the UCLA Chicano Studies Research Center and curated by Chon Noriega and Terezita Romo. The show was part of the Getty Foundation's "Pacific Standard Time: Art in Los Angeles, 1945-1980" initiative. Catalogue: L.A. Xicano

2014-2017 "Our America: The Latino Presence in American Art", Smithsonian American Art Museum, Washington, DC, Oct 2013 – Mar 2014. Curated by E. Carmen Ramos. The exhibition presented works by 72 leading modern and contemporary artists and went on tour. Catalogue Our America: The Latino Presence in American Art, by Carmen Ramos with an introduction by Tomás Ybarra-Frausto.

Tour stops included:

- 2014 Patricia and Phillip Frost Art Museum at Florida International University Miami, FL
- 2015 Crocker Art Museum Sacramento, CA
- 2015 Utah Museum of Fine Arts Salt Lake City, UT
- 2016 Arkansas Museum of Fine Arts Little Rock, AR
- 2016 Delaware Art Museum Wilmington, DE
- 2016 Allentown Art Museum Allentown, PA
- 2017 Museum of Fine Arts St. Petersburg, FL
- 2017 Hunter Museum of American Art Chattanooga, TN

== Public collections ==
- The Smithsonian American Art Museum, Washington, DC
- Nora Eccles Harrison Museum of Art, Logan, UT
