= Manuel Lopes =

Manuel Lopes may refer to:

- Manuel Lopes Rodrigues (1860-1917), Brazilian painter
- Manuel Lopes (barber) (died 1895), Cape Verdean-American barber
- Manuel Lopes (writer) (1907-1935), Cape Verdean poet and writer
- Manuel Lopes (footballer) (born 2000), Portuguese footballer

== See also ==
- Manuel López (disambiguation)
