= Manny Lopez =

Manny Lopez may refer to:

- Manny SD Lopez, Filipino activist
- Manny Lopez (legislator), House representative for Manila's 1st congressional district
- Manny Lopez, a minor character in the American TV series George Lopez

== See also ==
- Manuel López
