= Party crews =

Underground party scene in California

- Hellraisers party crew at a warehouse party, 1991

General Information
- Location: Southern California (East Los Angeles, South Los Angeles, San Gabriel Valley, Bay area, San Fernando Valley, Orange County)
- Point in time: late-1990s to early-2000s
- Types of events: raves; ditch parties; warehouse parties; backyard parties; flyer parties
- Party crews: Aztecas; Lunatic Ladies; Barachos MC PC; Get Low Productions; LA death squad; KrazyAzzLatinaz; The Baldies; metal punk death squad; KrazyGetDownBoyz; Bay area death squad; Almighty Party Players; Suicidals; Romperoom Productions; almighty Latin players; insane C notes; Profile Playaz; Swing Kids

Party crews were organized groups of Latino teenagers that planned and hosted underground events, parties, and raves during the late-1990s and early-2000s in Los Angeles, California. Most are not nearly as prominent as they once were. Much like Tagger crews, party crews or pc’s did not have a structure as many gangs of the time. They were often very problematic for police due to lack of infrastructure and leadership, in most cases making it uncontainable and difficult to identify potential members .

== Jik ==
The origins of party crews are believed to be in the 1960s — when "ditch parties," or parties planned for teenagers during school hours — first emerged in Los Angeles. Antonio Villaraigosa, the former Los Angeles mayor, attended ditch parities when he was young.

Party crews, which were defined by writer Janice Llamoca as "a group of friends (mostly teenagers) who are dedicated to going to and throwing underground parties," first emerged in Los Angeles in the late-1980s throwing backyard parities. By the 1990s, party crews formed an organized party circuit, hosting weekend parties in backyards, parking lots, and warehouses in East and South Los Angeles, the San Gabriel and San Fernando valleys, Orange County, and the Inland Empire. By 1995, it is estimated 500 party crews existed across Southern California. Some parties were hosted on nearby reservations. Party crews were named, and included groups such as a Lunatic Ladies, Get Low Productions, Profile Playaz and even larger partnerships between crews like 5N1 Kreations which included 5 or (multiple) party crews, Heartbreakers, Sweet N Krazy, Wisemen, LA Death Squad, LowLifes & Sykotic Females .

== Resistant cultural practice ==
According to the writer Virginia Arce, the prevalence of ditch parties and party crews of the 1990s can be attributed to the political climate of the era. According to Arce, the parties were a reaction against the criminalization of Latinos through the rise of the industrial-prison complex and the passage of Proposition 187, as well as the economic devastation of the Personal Responsibility and Work Opportunity Act.

Guadalupe Rosales, the founder of an Instagram archive of party crews, writes, "At a time when Latino communities in Los Angeles were often disempowered and criminalized by the public school system, party crews and raves were our way of organizing for the sake of unity." Party crew events have been described as a "resistant cultural practice," which allowed Latino youth to reject the criminalization and misrepresentation they experienced in the 1990s.

== Early-2000s ==
In the early 2000s, the party crew scene underwent changes, as hip-hop and reggaeton replaced house music; MySpace and Techno4Us became the primary mediums of advertisement; and the parties moved from backyards to mostly indoor venues. In the early 2000s, noz also became an important part of party crew events. Police raids were common, and the media covered party crew events as out-of-control. This increased after the 2006 unsolved murder of Emmery Muñoz.

== T-Parties ==
Infamous, a party crew in East Los Angeles, was known for throwing “T-parties,” which were events specifically for LGBT Latinos. According to Cal Poly Pomona professor Anthony Christian Ocampo, T-parties occurred in the late-1990s and were mostly held in backyards, parking lots, as well as locations such as a laundromat and an auto repair shop. According to Ocampo, T-parties were attended by between 100 and 200 people, with the majority Latino, and some Black and Asian teenagers as well. In his book Brown and Gay in LA, Ocampo writes many of the young men dressed like cholos. Quoting one attendee, Ocampo writes, "You’d see these straight-up gangsters with tatted-out heads making out with other guys. I was like, ‘What the fuck? Like freakin’ cholos making out.'"
