= Veronica Terriquez =

Chicana sociologist, professor, and activist (born 1971/1972)

Veronica Terriquez (born 1971/1972) is a Chicana sociologist, professor, and social justice activist who since June 2021 has been director of the Chicano Studies Research Center at the University of California, Los Angeles. Additionally, she is professor of urban planning, Chicana/o studies, and Central American studies. She is specialized in social inequality and civic engagement among racial minorities, although mostly under the purview of Latino studies.

== Biography ==
In 1971 or 1972, she was born to undocumented Mexican immigrants in the United States. In 1993, she graduated from Alverno High School and earned $500 from the Avery Dennison Leadershio Scholarship to attend Harvard University. As a senior in 1996, she participated in a march on Washington D.C., a protest for various Latino issues. In a statement to the Boston Sunday Globe, she lamented the lack of Latinos in higher education. She graduated from Harvard with a bachelor's degree in sociology, the University of California, Berkeley with a master's in education, and the University of California, Los Angeles (UCLA) with a PhD in sociology. By 2012, she had joined the faculty of the University of California, Santa Cruz (UCSC). Her research and activism has engaged unions, community organizations, and local governments.

On July 1, 2021, she succeeded Chon Noriega as the first female director of the UCLA Chicano Studies Research Center (CSRC). She was also appointed to professorships at the Luskin School of Public Affairs and UCLA College, leaving her position as associate professor of sociology at UCSC. In 2022, CSRC in collaboration with the UCLA Latino Policy and Politics Institute established the Latina Futures 2050 Lab, dedicated to policy research regarding Latinas in fields like education and law and promoting their involvement in politics. On November 3, a commencement ceremony was held in which the project received $15 million from the 2023-2024 state budget; among the attendees were California politicians María Elena Durazo, Sabrina Cervantes, Wendy Carrillo, and Isaac Bryan. As of February 2025, she was professor of urban planning, Chicana/o studies, and Central American studies.

== Works ==
Additionally editing the 20th volume of Latino Studies, her bibliography includes:

=== Monograph ===
- Terriquez, Veronica (March 2026). Learning to Lead: Youth Organizing in Immigrant Communities. Russell Sage Foundation. doi:10.7758/gert1126.1342. ISBN 978-0-87154-852-8. Project MUSE book 142835.

=== Articles ===
- Terriquez, Veronica (2015). "Intersectional Mobilization, Social Movement Spillover, and Queer Youth Leadership in the Immigrant Rights Movement". Social Problems. 62 (3): 343–362. doi:10.1093/socpro/spv010. ISSN 0037-7791. JSTOR 26370854.
- Terriquez, Veronica; Milkman, Ruth (2021). "Immigrant and Refugee Youth Organizing in Solidarity with the Movement for Black Lives". Gender & Society. 35 (4): 577–587. doi:10.1177/08912432211029396. ISSN 0891-2432. JSTOR 27103121.

== Awards and honors ==
- Fellow (2020-2021) of the Center for Advanced Study in the Behavioral Sciences
- University Faculty Award (2021) by the American Association of Hispanics in Higher Education
- Award for Public Sociology in International Migration (2021) by the American Sociological Association

== See also ==
- Excelencia in Education
