= Cordelia Candelaria =

American educator and writer (born 1943)

Cordelia Chávez Candelaria
- Born: September 14, 1943 (age 82); Deming, New Mexico, US
- Education: Fort Lewis College (BA); University of Notre Dame (MA, PhD)
- Occupations: Educator, writer

Cordelia Chávez Candelaria (born September 14, 1943) is an American educator and writer of Hispanic descent.

== Early life and education ==
Candelaria was born on September 14, 1943, in Deming, New Mexico, to Ray J. Chávez and Eloida Trujillo. She received her Bachelor of Arts degree from Fort Lewis College, where she studied English and French. She then earned a Master of Arts in English and a PhD in American literature and structural linguistics from the University of Notre Dame.

== Career ==
From 1975 to 1978, Candelaria was an associate professor of English and Chicano literature at Idaho State University. She was also a program officer for the Division of Research at the National Endowment for the Humanities from 1976 to 1977. From 1978 to 1991, she was an associate professor of English and head of the Chicano Studies Program at the University of Colorado Boulder. During her time at the university, she also founded the Center for the Study of Ethnicity and Race in America. In 1991, she became an American literature professor and research associate at the Hispanic Research Center of Arizona State University. From 2001 to 2005, she served as chair of the Department of Chicana and Chicano Studies.

In 2008, Candelaria was named dean of the Dedman College of Humanities and Sciences at Southern Methodist University, but she resigned from the position the following year for personal reasons.

== Personal life ==
Candelaria married José Fidel Candelaria in 1961, and later Ronald Beveridge.

== Works ==
Candelaria published her first collection of poetry, Ojo de la Cueva (Cave Springs), in 1984. She also served as the executive editor for the Encyclopedia of Latino Popular Culture and has published literary criticism in various literary journals.

Other works include:

- Chicano Poetry: A Critical Introduction (1986)
- Seeking the Perfect Game: Baseball in American literature (1989)
- Arroyo to the Heart, poetry (1993)

== Awards and honors ==
Candelaria has received several awards and honors throughout her career, including the Thomas Jefferson Award in 1983, the Colorado University Equity and Excellence Faculty Award in 1989, and a 15-year Higher Education Replication Study award in 1991 from the National Sponsoring Committee in Boulder. In 2005, she received the Outstanding Latino/a Cultural Award in Literary Arts or Publications.

== Film ==
Candelaria worked on the script for the 1982 film The Ballad of Gregorio Cortez as a script co-editor and consultant. She also served as a script consultant for The Milagro Beanfield War.
