= Gil Cuadros =

American poet

- Born: July 22, 1962
- Died: August 29, 1996 (aged 34)
- Occupations: Author; poet; ceramist

Gil Cuadros (July 22, 1962 – August 29, 1996) was an American gay poet, essayist, and ceramist known for his writing on the impact of AIDS.

== Biography ==
Cuadros grew up in Montebello, California with parents from Northern California. He attended Schurr High School, where he met photographer Laura Aguilar, with whom he remained close friends throughout his life. After high school, Cuadros attended East Los Angeles Community College for one year before transferring to Pasadena City College. Cuadros worked at a photo lab where he met his lover, John Edward Milosch. In 1987, Milosch died of AIDS and Cuadros was diagnosed with the disease.

Laura Aguilar encouraged Cuadros to attend Terry Wolverton's writing workshops for people with HIV at the Los Angeles Gay and Lesbian Center, which Cuadros did in 1988, igniting a passion for writing. Despite initially being told that he had six months to live, Cuadros lived for eight years after his diagnosis, stating that "writing literally saved my life or at least extended my life".

Cuadros won the Brody Literature Fellowship, in 1991 and he was one of the first recipients of PEN Center USA/West grants to writers with HIV. Cuadros’ only book published during his lifetime was City of God (City Lights Publishers, 1994). A posthumous volume of stories and poems, My Body is Paper, was published in 2024, also by City Lights, and was shortlisted for the 2024 POZ Award for Best Literature

Cuadros died of AIDS at age 34, on August 29, 1996. Joshua Guzman writes that Cuadros' literature made an impact on the history of AIDS by providing a testimonial that "explores the impact that AIDS has had on the gay Chicano community."

== Themes ==
Cuadros' City of God (see below), and other early works are considered the first of their kind to serve as testimonials for Chicanos with AIDS. Throughout his works Cuadros gives visibility to two identities that are often denied within the Chicano community: homosexuals and people living with AIDS. Among other things, Cuadros's stories and poems address the themes of sex, death, Roman Catholicism, family relations, and the meaning of home.

=== Commentaries ===
Latinx writers and scholars José Monteagudo, Rafael Ocasio, Raúl Homero Villa, and Rafael Pérez-Torres have expressed that Gil Cuadros' work has yet to be fully recognized and valued. Homero Villa has expressed that Cuadros literary output has given readers queer insights into the changing space of East Los Angeles as well as its "fractured Chicano geography". Monteagudo published an influential early review of City of God (1994). Ocasio argued that the AIDS testimonial of Cuadros and those of Cuban exile writer, Reinaldo Arenas, have both provided their respective communities narratives with a "foundation" that serves to empower. Rafael Pérez-Torres has asserted that Cuadros' work "is illustrative of the vexed intersection of race and queer sexuality."

== City of God (1994) ==
City of God consists of short stories and poems. The title of the book alludes to the theological masterpiece of Church Father Augustine of Hippo, The City of God, published in 426 AD. In his treatise, Augustine examines the conflict between the "City of Man" (an earthly city) and the holy, eternal "City of God." Cuadros's choice of title bespeaks a similar dichotomy, inviting readers to view his stories and poems from both an earthly and eternal perspective. Cuadros's City of God is presented in two sections: part 1 (stories) and part 2 (poems). Thematically, part 1 is broken into three groups of three. Each group depicts different ages and phases of a single life lived by different characters. The first three stories "Indulgences", "Reynaldo", and "Chilvalry" talk about issues of origin. That is, how childhood experiences shape "sexual and gender identification". Furthermore, these first three stories depict the Chicano family and growing up queer in Los Angeles. The next group, "My Aztlan: White Place", "Unprotected", and "Holy" speak about the difficulties that arise when homosexuality intersects with the Chicano self such as familial opposition. The last three stories "Baptism", "Letting Go", and "Sight" discuss the transformation the Chicano body undergoes as it faces the effects of a ravaging disease. Rafael Pérez-Torres states that the stories trace the "development and transformation of a new mestizo subject, one forced to accommodate an ethnic identity and experience with an alienating but crucial sexual identity". Overall, City of God provides its readers a personal understanding of the historical background of HIV/AIDS in the United States during the 1980s and 1990s. Beyond that, City of God presents its readers with a unique perspective on Chicano gay history in relation to the Chicano Movement.

=== AIDS and Los Angeles ===
The book not only depicts the characters' experiences shaped by their surroundings but also invites readers to see his characters "merge with the city." For Cuadros (the fictional character), the city is his Aztlán, or Mecca. Although "Aztlán" refers to the mythical Aztec homeland that the Chicano Movement in the 1960–1970s ascribed to as a place of communal belonging, Cuadros paints Aztlán, or Los Angeles, as a dystopia. In the story, any representations of Los Angeles are analogous to that of the character's AIDS-infected body. For example, "I look like the city, / only bare bones of what I used to be". Los Angeles is also portrayed through Saint Augustine's "earthly city of eternal misery." The queer community in Los Angeles is also depicted to reflect the dominant culture of the white middle class.

== Works ==
=== Books ===
- My Body is Paper: Stories and Poems, published by City Lights Publishers. 2024. ISBN 978-0-87286-909-7
- City of God, published by City Lights Publishers. 1994. ISBN 978-0-87286-295-1

=== Appearances ===
- Indivisible: New Short Fiction by West Coast Gay and Lesbian Writers (1991)
- High Risk 2: Writings on Sex, Death and Subversion (1994)
- Blood Whispers: L.A. Writers on AIDS, Volume 1 (1994)
- The Soho Press Book of 80s Short Fiction, Dale Peck, Ed, Soho Press (2016)
