= Manuel López (artist) =

Chicano artist from Los Angeles area

Manuel Lopez
- Born: 1983 (age 42–43); Los Angeles, California
- Education: School of the Art Institute of Chicago
- Known for: Landscapes, cityscapes
- Notable work: For The Love Of L.A. series
- Movement: Chicano art scene

Manuel López (born 1983) is an artist and educator based in Los Angeles, California. He is an emerging artist in the Chicano art scene and has shown his work at museums and galleries in Los Angeles, Chicago, and New York City. He specializes in traditional drawing and painting. López's cityscapes express the details he observes in his surroundings such as run-down houses, palm trees, and silent and still neighborhoods. Along with his surroundings, he also expresses the memories he holds of the experiences within his area.

== Early life and education ==
Manuel López was born in 1983 in the Boyle Heights neighborhood of Los Angeles. His father encouraged him and his sisters to draw and create art. López recalled drawing cereal mascots such as Trix the Rabbit and selling his first work, a drawing of The Rocketeer, to a neighbor. López transferred to the School of the Art Institute of Chicago after attending East Los Angeles College.

He received a Bachelors in both painting and drawing from the Art Institute. His early influences were the murals and streets of East L.A., cartoons, comics and the Mexican painter Frida Kahlo.

While at the Art Institute, López lived in the Mexican neighborhood of Pilsen. His artistic sensibility was influenced by Philip Guston and Willem de Kooning. People have called his work "tropical", "exotic" and "very Latin", as well as "not your culture" when he veered away from vernacular Latino or Chicano content.

== Career ==
After earning his BFA, he returned to East Los Angeles to a new home his father had bought, and there he continued to paint and draw while also working to develop his style. López has lectured and shown his art throughout the greater Los Angeles area. He currently works as a substitute teacher at elementary schools.

His subject matter focuses on the East L.A, El Sereno and City Terrace neighborhoods of greater Los Angeles. Lopez has been recognized by Transformative Arts, a non-profit organization that supports community visual literacy and arts programming. His meticulous cityscapes have been described as "daily diary entries".

In 2020, López began distributing at no cost the Eleven Drawings for SHG coloring book during the early days of the pandemic. as well as the Not So Typical Coloring Book as a stay-home activity to do with loved ones during the COVID pandemic. It was published by Self Help Graphics & Art; the drawings were inspired by López's day-to-day life.

In 2021, the Los Angeles Times Image Magazine featured, as part of its L.A. – We See You! series, Manuel Lopez wants you to see the Tongva land on which this L.A. handball court sits, a photo essay with descriptive text authored by the artist, of a site-specific outdoor drawing installation.

== Exhibitions ==
López's work has been exhibited in museums and institutions, including the Lancaster Museum of Art and History (MOAH); the Vincent Price Art Museum, Los Angeles, CA; New Image Art, in West Hollywood, CA; Self Help Graphics & Art, Boyle Heights, CA; Abrazo Interno Gallery, New York, NY; the Betty Rymer Gallery, Chicago, IL, and Sullivan Galleries, Chicago, IL, among others. López's work was included in the 2019 SUR:Biennial, Cuentista (storyteller), organized at the Río Hondo College Art Gallery.

López's first solo exhibition, So Mundane and Incomplete, was held in 2018 at Eastern Projects Gallery in Los Angeles. The exhibit featured a series of plein aire cityscapes and landscapes drawn on location in East L.A. The work expressed an attention to detail and close observation of the environment such as: "shifting landscape(s), and the fleeting appearance of an everyday object(s)." Imagery included views of East L.A. such as City Terrace, Boyle Heights, and El Sereno, depicting run-down houses, a stranger lost in thought, crooked palm trees, a serene terrain that is ever-changing, and various man-made objects.

Group exhibitions include the Dark Progressivism show in 2018 at the Lancaster Museum of Art and History. The exhibit focused on the notion of rasquachismo, a term in Mexican culture meaning "low-class" or "beneath respect." The artists included in the exhibition use rasquache or "low-brow" sensibilities to reflect on street life. The Vincent Price Museum show, Regeneración: Three Generations of Revolutionary Ideology , explored the transnational circulation of ideas and artistic practice between the U.S. and Mexico in relation to activism and revolution. The IN COLOR exhibition at Quotidian gallery and Klowden Mann gallery featured a selection of López's watercolors and oil paintings along with the work of five other artists.

The Los Angeles Music Center showcased López in its digital series For the Love of L.A. that included more than 35 artists. Running from August 11, 2020 to October 27, 2020, the showcase was a means for artists to share their views of the city of Los Angeles that would be shared on social media such as Instagram. López's video depicts a hilly Eastside community drawn with white on a black background, different than his usual pencil on paper. The artwork was turned into a four and a half minute video of a slowly changing cityscape with a purple gradient sky in multiple variations. This created the effect of motion; the visuals were paired with sound to evoke feeling, such as the laughter of children, the ringing of bells, the passing of cars, and the barking of a dog.

Marvella Muro, the curator of the series, writes that López's "meticulous drawings capture the hilly settings of the Eastside with old rooftops and sky views filled with palm trees, the tops of tall pine trees, and electric lines." The Boyle Heights Beat describes the sound track as a mix of "the jingle of paleteros selling their wares, birds chirping, traffic passing by."

In 2025, López's work was included in the group exhibition, Surface Streets, curated by Russell Ferguson, at the Marion Goodman Gallery, Los Angeles.

== Public art work ==
In 2021, the Los Angeles County Metropolitan Transportation Authority commissioned Lopéz to produce a new "tribute poster" for the transit system. The artwork is based on a poem by Joseph Rios, An Ode to the Essential. It is on display in print and digital display forms in bus, rail and platform locations, as well as in maintenance facilities, offices, and customer care centers. Metro Art states that it honors the "workers includ[ing] our own employees — who have kept L.A. County moving — and our riders, many of whom are also essential workers. The poster also honors all those we have lost during the COVID-19 pandemic."

== Bibliography ==
- Mejias-Rentas, Antonio. "Images of East L.A. launch online arts series." The Eastsider. Last modified August 18, 2020. https://www.theeastsiderla.com/neighborhoods/east_los_angeles/images-of-east-l-a-launch-online-arts-series/article_8f210e64-dcdc-11ea-a52c-238f38682a17.html.
