= Chon Noriega =

American art academic and curator

Chon A. Noriega
- Born: 1961 (age 64–65); Miami, Florida, U.S.

Academic background
- Education: University of Illinois at Chicago, Stanford University

Chon A. Noriega is an American art historian, media scholar, and curator. Noriega is professor of cinema and media studies at UCLA School of Theater, Film and Television. He was also the director of the UCLA Chicano Studies Research Center (CSRC) from 2002 to 2021.

Noriega is an adjunct curator at Los Angeles County Museum of Art (LACMA), where he has worked as an curator since the 1990s. He has curated major exhibitions at Cornell University and LACMA.

== Early life ==
Noriega was born in Miami, Florida in 1961. His father was a beat reporter for the Associated Press from La Luz, New Mexico. His mother was from Kentucky. They moved to Chicago in 1973, where his father ran a PR agency and ran for mayor in the early 1990s. He graduated with a bachelor's in English from the University of Illinois at Chicago. He received his master's and PhD from Stanford University.

== Career ==
Noriega was an assistant professor of American studies at the University of New Mexico. He moved to Los Angeles in summer 1992 to teach at the University of California, Los Angeles (UCLA). At UCLA, he served as the director of the UCLA Chicano Studies Research Center (CSRC) from 2002 to 2021. He was succeeded as director of CSRC by Veronica Terriquez in June 2021.

Noriega co-founded the National Association of Latino Independent Producers in 1999.

In 2011, Noriega curated L.A. Xicano, an exhibit about the contributions of Mexican American artists in Los Angeles since 1945, for Pacific Standard Time, an eight-month long series of exhibitions that profiled the Los Angeles art scene from 1945 to 1980.

In 2017, Noriega co-curated a retrospective exhibit of photographer Laura Aguilar for the Getty Foundation with Vincent Price Art Museum director Karen Rapp and East Los Angeles College art professor Sybil Venegas.

Noriega received the 2021 Guggenheim Fellowship in the category of Fine Arts Research for two books about Raphael Montañez Ortiz.

== Select bibliography ==
- Shot in America: Television, the State, and the Rise of Chicano Cinema (2000) ISBN 9781452904276, 1452904278
