= Reynaldo Rivera =

Mexican photographer (born 1964)

- Born: 1964; Mexicali, Baja California, Mexico
- Known for: Photography, notably of Latinx culture

Reynaldo Rivera (born 1964) is a Mexican photographer whose work documents queer, transgender and predominantly Latinx scenes starting in late 20th-century Los Angeles, including clubs, house parties, and everyday life. His photography captured venues such as La Plaza, the Silverlake Lounge, Mugy's, and Little Joy.

Rivera's black-and-white photographs document private moments and the lives of Latinx women, artists and drag performers during this period. His work highlights communities affected by gentrification, violence, and with limited public record-keeping, which contributed to their marginalization. Rivera's photography provides a historical record of these under-represented groups in Los Angeles.

== Early life and career ==
Reynaldo Rivera was born in 1964 in Mexicali, Mexico. While growing up, he moved throughout the United States and Mexico. He now resides permanently in East Los Angeles.

Rivera's mother and father were both born in Mexico. After his parents separated, Rivera oscillated between living with his mother and his father. He navigated his childhood moving to various places, including Stockton, Pasadena, Mexicali, and Santa Ana, alongside his sister Herminia. From the age of five, Rivera lived with his abusive grandmother for four consecutive years after being kidnapped by his father. Thereafter, Rivera's father would often bring him from Glendale to the San Joaquin Valley, where Rivera was exposed to his father's illegal activities. Rivera also had run-ins with the law, including facing charges in the sixth grade for selling drugs.

Rivera describes photography as a means to achieve stability. His first camera was a Pentax K1000. In the early 1980s, Rivera began his career by photographing hotel cleaners. His first piece, created in 1983, aimed to document the site where his step-grandfather was murdered in Mexico City. Rivera credits the employee at the film store he frequented for explaining the mechanics of the camera after his initial pictures came out blank. During his early pursuit of photography, Rivera did not have enough money to afford buying many rolls of film, which forced him to strengthen his editing skills.

Rivera's first professional assignment in his 20's was photographing live punk and rock music, such as performances by Depeche Mode, Siouxsie and the Banshees, and Sonic Youth. He then transitioned to photographing drag bars, house parties, and queer clubs during the 1980's and 1990's.

== Works, exhibitions, projects, collections ==
=== Notable works / selected works ===
- Tatiana Volty, 1986, Silverlake Lounge
- Anna LaCazio and Judy Pokonosky, 1989, Echo Park
- Elyse Regehr and Javier Orosco, 1989, Downtown LA
- Miss Alex, 1992, Echo Park
- Olga, 1992, La Plaza
- Wes Cuttler, 1992, Echo Park
- Angela, 1993, La Plaza
- Gaby, Reynaldo and Angela, 1993, La Plaza
- Laura, La Plaza, 1993
- Melissa and Gaby, 1993, La Plaza
- Montenegro, 1995, Silverlake Lounge
- Patron, 1995, Silverlake Lounge
- Performer, 1995, Silverlake Lounge
- Tina, 1995, Mugy's
- Vanessa, 1995, Silverlake Lounge
- Richard Villegas Jr., friend, and Enrique, 1996
- Girls, 1997, El Conquistador
- La Plaza, 1997, La Plaza

=== Exhibitions, projects and collections ===
- Fistful of Love/También la belleza, MoMA PS1, 2024, New York
- Kiss Me Deadly, Reena Spaulings Fine Art, 2021, New York
- Made in LA 2020: A Version, Hammer Museum / The Huntington Library, 2021, Los Angeles
- Comedy of Errors, The Gallery At, 2020, Hollywood
- Avengers - Someone Left a Cake Out in the Rain, Gaga & Reena Spaulings Fine Art, 2019, Los Angeles
- Museum of Modern Art, New York
- The Whitney Museum of American Art, New York
- Museum of Contemporary Art, Los Angeles
- The Getty, Los Angeles
