= Guadalupe Rosales =

American visual artist (born 1980)

- Born: 1980 (age 45–46); Redwood City, California, U.S.
- Education: School of the Art Institute of Chicago
- Known for: Artist, educator, archivist
- Website: www.veteranasandrucas.com

Guadalupe Rosales (born 1980) is an American artist and educator. She is best known for her archival projects, “Veteranas and Rucas” and “Map Pointz,” found on social media. The archives focus on Latino backyard party scenes and underground party crew subculture in Los Angeles in the late-twentieth century and early-twenty first.

== Early life and education ==
Guadalupe Rosales was born in 1980 in Redwood City, California. She was raised in East Los Angeles and Boyle Heights, California. She is the daughter of Mexican-American immigrants from Uruapan, Michoacan and Jerez, Zacatecas. When she was only 16 years old when she lost her cousin to gang violence.

She was educated at the School of the Art Institute of Chicago (SAIC) and received an MFA degree in 2016 As an adult and artist, she uses her personal story to encourage others to use their voices as a powerful tool for self-representation.

== Career ==
Guadalupe Rosales started collecting vernacular photography in 2015. She has crowd sourced a digital archive. Her Instagram accounts are named "Veteranas & Rucas" and "Map Pointz".

In her studio practice, Guadalupe works with sculpture, photography, video, sound, drawing, and community based projects and collaborations, and the archive, centering on the creation of immersive and sensorial spaces to activate memory and evoke a collective experience and embodiment.

One such immersive space can be found in the photo booth. For example, in "Legends Never Die, A Collective Memory", an exhibition at Aperture Foundation in 2018, "begins with a blown-up black-and-white portrait of two beautiful teenage girls seated cheek to cheek in a photo booth, their eyebrows thinly arched."

Guadalupe’s studio also houses and preserves a physical archive of Chicano/Latinx ephemera from the 1970s to the late-1990s, including but not limited to magazines, prison art and letters, posters and flyers from the Los Angeles underground backyard-party and rave scenes of the 1990s. "Her projects is to deepen and re-contextualize the narrative of Latinos often stereotyped and profiled as gangsters or “cholos." "She creates counter-narratives and tells the stories of communities often underrepresented in public record and official memory."

In 2016, Rosales took over the New Yorker Magazine's social media account for a week. It was one of the top-rated takeovers of the year. In 2017, the Los Angeles County Museum of Art (LACMA) gave Rosales a 6 week take over of their Instagram account.

She showed her Installation "Guadalupe Rosales: Echoes of a Collective Memory" at the Vincent Price Art Museum, September 2018 to March 2019.

In 2026, Rosales was among the 111 artists invited to be a part of the 61st Venice Biennale by Koyo Kouoh.

== Work ==
=== Exhibitions ===
- 2022 Whitney Biennial (2022), Whitney Museum, New York City, New York
- Guadalupe Rosales: Drifting on a Memory (2021-2023), Dallas Museum of Art, Dallas, Texas
- Guadalupe Rosales: El Rocío sobre las madrugadas sin fin. (2019), Museo Universitario del Chopo, Mexico City, Mexico
- Guadalupe Rosales: Echoes of a Collective Memory, Vincent Price Art Museum, Monterey Park, California
- Guadalupe Rosales: Legends Never Die, A Collective Memory (2019), Haverford College, Haverford, Pennsylvania
- Guadalupe Rosales: Legends Never Die, A Collective Memory (2018), Aperture Gallery, Aperture Foundation, New York City, New York
- Guadalupe Rosales: Tzahualli: Mi memoria en tu reflejo,” (2025), Palm Springs Art Museum
- “In Minor Keys,” curated by the late Koyo Kouoh, (2026) Venice Biennale.

=== Awards and nominations ===
- 2019 recipient of Gordon Parks Foundation fellowship
- 2020 United States Artists Award fellow

=== Publications ===
- Map Pointz A Collective Memory, 2019
- East of the River: A Memoir of Los Angeles Girlhood, September 8, 2026
