= Star Montana =

American photographer

Star Montana (born 1987) is a Los Angeles-based photographer. Her work has been shown in museums and galleries such as the Vincent Price Art Museum, The Main Museum, ArtCenter, internationally in Brazil, Ecuador, and Mexico, and in the L.A. Metro Vermont/Beverly station from 2014 to 2016. She has also been featured in articles in Aperture and Hyperallergic.

== Early life ==
Montana grew up in the predominantly Mexican American Boyle Heights neighborhood of East Los Angeles. She describes her teenage self as a "street kid" who found photography when one of her friends showed Montana some photographs she took for a class at East Los Angeles College, and Montana realized she could pursue photography as an art form.

== Education ==
She is a first-generation high school and college graduate. She attended East Los Angeles College but transferred and received her BFA in 2013 from the School of Visual Arts in New York City. She is currently an MFA candidate at the University of Southern California.

== Career ==
Montana is known for her photographs which capture her home community of Boyle Heights. Her first solo show was Tear Drops and Three Dots at the Vincent Price Art Museum in 2016. The show used candid photographs to chronicle a personal and community narrative of loss and redemption in the wake of her mother's struggle with narcotics, her illness, and the aftermath of her death from complications related to Hepatitis C in 2010. "Star Montana: I Dream of Los Angeles" at The Main Museum in 2017 captured Boyle Heights residents in meditative moments. The show included extensive, personal narratives alongside her photographs, allowing her subjects to fully explore and share the complexities of their lives.

Her art bridges what she perceives as a gap in the art world. As she told Surface in 2017, “I think a lot of art is inaccessible to regular people,” she says. “They don’t feel worthy of it. I experienced that a lot.”

Montana cites Joseph Rodriguez, who she first learned of as a teenager through a Google search of "East L.A. Photographer," as an inspiration and a mentor.
