= Manuel López Oliva =

- Born: 1947 (age 78–79); Manzanillo, Cuba
- Education: National School of Art (Escuela Nacional de Arte), Havana
- Known for: Painting, drawing, art criticism
- Website: http://www.lopezoliva.com

Manuel López Oliva (born 1947) is a Cuban painter, draftsman, art critic, curator, and educator. His work has been exhibited in Cuba and internationally and has been the subject of retrospective exhibitions at the National Museum of Fine Arts in Havana and the Bates College Museum of Art in the United States.

Born in Manzanillo, Cuba, López Oliva studied at the National School of Art in Havana, graduating in 1969. He later worked as an art educator and became active as a critic and essayist, publishing on visual art and culture in Cuban journals and newspapers.

Alongside his work as a writer and educator, López Oliva developed a career as a painter and draftsman. His work has frequently been discussed in relation to theatrical imagery, masks, and staged figures. The catalogue accompanying the 2012 retrospective Mímesis noted the recurring presence of characters and performances in his paintings, while the Bates College Museum of Art described his work as drawing on literary, historical, and theatrical references.

In 2003, the Bates College Museum of Art organized Cuba and the Theater of Desire, an exhibition devoted to his work. In 2012, the National Museum of Fine Arts in Havana presented Mímesis, an anthological exhibition surveying two decades of his artistic production.

López Oliva has also been active in Cuban cultural institutions, including the National Union of Writers and Artists of Cuba (UNEAC). He received the Guy Pérez Cisneros National Award for Art Criticism for his contribution to art criticism in Cuba.
