= Manuel López (Chilean footballer) =

Chilean footballer (born 1972)

Personal information
- Full name: Manuel Ignacio López Urzúa
- Date of birth: 18 June 1972 (age 54)
- Place of birth: Chile
- Height: 1.90 m (6 ft 3 in)
- Position: Defender

Youth career
- O'Higgins

Senior career*
Years	Team	Apps	(Gls)
1992–1994	O'Higgins	1	(0)
1993	→ Unión Santa Cruz (loan)	18	(2)
1995–1999	Deportes Puerto Montt	134	(8)
1998	→ Toluca (loan)	18	(0)
2000	León	13	(0)
2000–2002	Huachipato	63	(6)
2002	Cobresal	17	(1)
2003–2004	Deportes Puerto Montt	14	(1)
2005	Deportes Arica	18	(1)
2006	Rangers	6	(1)
2007	Deportes Copiapó	3	(0)
Total		305	(20)
- * Club domestic league appearances and goals

Manuel Ignacio López Urzúa (born 18 June 1972) is a Chilean former professional footballer who played as a defender for clubs in Chile and Mexico.

== Club career ==
A product of the O'Higgins youth system, he made an appearance for the club in the 1994 season, after playing on loan at Unión Santa Cruz in 1993.

In Chile he also played for Deportes Puerto Montt, being a well remembered player for the club, Huachipato, Cobresal, Deportes Arica, Rangers and Deportes Copiapó.

As an anecdote, as a member of Deportes Puerto Montt, in July 1999 he took part in a friendly international tournament in Singapore in the context of an economic and cultural exchange between Chile and the Asian country, where they faced Home United FC and Toluca. López was one of the most striking players due to his height.

Abroad he played in Mexico for both Toluca (loan) and León. With Toluca, he won the Primera División de México Verano 1998.

== Personal life ==
He was nicknamed Robocop due to his strong build.

== Honours ==
Toluca

- Primera División de México: 1998 Verano
