= Vincent Price Art Museum =

Museum in Monterey Park, California

- Former name: Vincent and Mary Price Gallery
- Established: 1957
- Location: 1301 Avenida Cesar Chavez, Monterey Park, CA 91754
- Coordinates: 34.0388°N 118.1470°W
- Type: University art museum
- Director: Steven Wong
- Website: vpam.org

The Vincent Price Art Museum (VPAM) is an art museum located at East Los Angeles College in Monterey Park, California, US.

The museum is named after American actor Vincent Price who donated portions of his personal art collection to the college in 1957. The museum's collection now contains over 9,000 objects ranging from impressionist paintings to Japanese prints to objects from the Ancient Americas, 2,000 of which were donated by Price.

It has been a venue for underrepresented artists since its founding, organizing key solo exhibitions for Los Angeles-based artists including Laura Aguilar, Carlos Almaraz, Nao Bustamante, Rafa Esparza, Judithe Hernández, Manuel López, Star Montana, Guadalupe Rosales, and Shizu Saldamando.

== Directors ==
- Thomas Silliman (1957–2006)
- Karen Rapp (2007–2015)
- Pilar Tompkins Rivas (2016–2020)
- Steven Wong (2021–present)
