= UCLA Chicano Studies Research Center =

U.S. research center

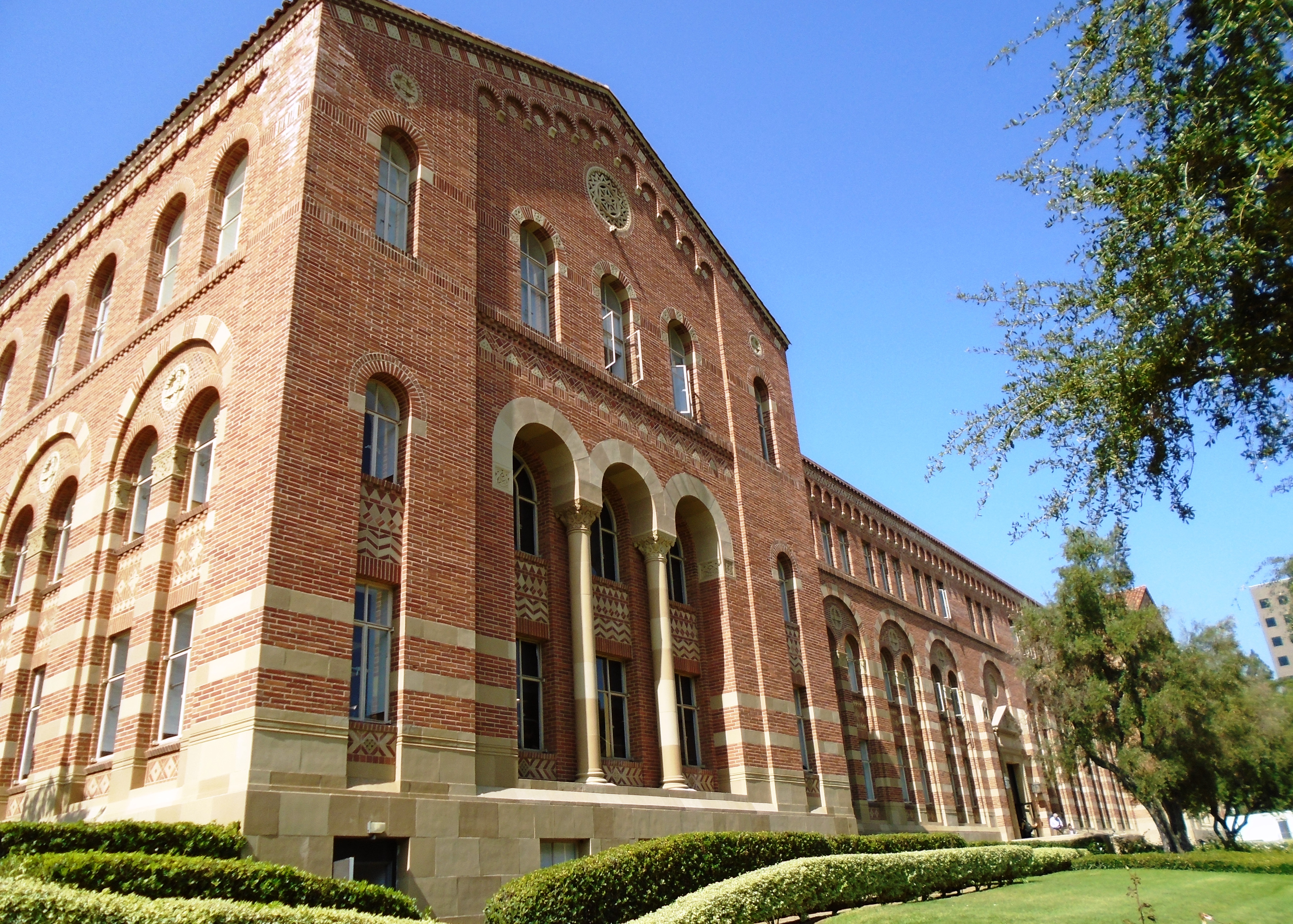
- Location: 193 Haines Hall, Los Angeles, California
- Type: Chicanx/Latinx Library and Archives
- Established: 1969
- Affiliation: University of California, Los Angeles
- Director: Veronica Terriquez
- Collection size: 648 archival and manuscript collections
- Website: https://www.chicano.ucla.edu/

The UCLA Chicano Studies Research Center (CSRC) is a research unit at the University of California, Los Angeles. Founded in 1969, the center conducts research on the history, culture, and social conditions of Chicano and Latino populations in the United States. It also maintains a library, archive, and supports academic research through publications and fellowship programs. The CSRC is part of UCLA’s Institute of American Cultures.

== Organization ==
The CSRC serves the entire campus and supports faculty and students in the social sciences, life sciences, humanities, and the professional schools. Its research focuses on the Chicano and Latino populations, who have historically faced limited access to higher education.

The CSRC is part of the Institute of American Cultures (IAC), which reports to the Office of the Chancellor at UCLA. The CSRC is also a founding member of the national Inter-University Program for Latino Research (IUPLR, established in 1983), a consortium of twenty-five Latino research centers across the United States.

== Facilities ==
The CSRC houses a library, research programs, and two competitive grant/fellowship programs organized through the IAC. Each year, the CSRC is able to augment grants and fellowships through funds created specifically for research at the CSRC. These include the Los Tigres del Norte Fund, the Tamar Diana Wilson Fund, and the Carlos M. Haro Scholarship Fund.

Since the 1970s, the CSRC has held six of the "institutional FTE (full-time equivalent)" faculty positions, which are assigned to academic departments on a loan basis.

== Press ==
The UCLA Chicano Studies Research Center Press publishes research about Mexican Americans. The press has published Aztlán: A Journal of Chicano Studies for over 53 years. Four books published by the CSRC in 2012 won 10 awards in eight different categories at Latino Literacy Now's 15th annual International Latino Book Awards. As of 2013, the press has received a total of 24 book awards. In 2020, the Press received three first-place awards in Latino Literacy Now's 22nd Awards Ceremony.

The A Ver: Revisioning Art History book series documents the work of prominent Latino artists. The Chicano Archives book series includes reference guides to UCLA library special collections on Chicanos. The Chicano Cinema & Media Arts series is an effort to preserve Chicano films and videos. The first DVD is about the two earliest Chicano art documentaries.

== Library ==
Established in 1969, the UCLA Chicano Studies Research Center Library is a non-circulating library, though most materials may be photocopied within the premises. The library has entered partnerships to provide online digital collections of music, photography, and the visual arts.

== Archive ==
The CSRC Archive holds over 120 collections, including periodicals, original prints by Chicana artists, and records. The Archive has recently undertaken on digital archive projects and works with UCLA-based libraries.

== Former names ==
- Mexican American Cultural Center, UCLA
- Chicano Cultural Center, UCLA
- Chicano Studies Center, UCLA
- Chicano Studies Research Center, UCLA
