= Chicana feminism =

Sociopolitical movement

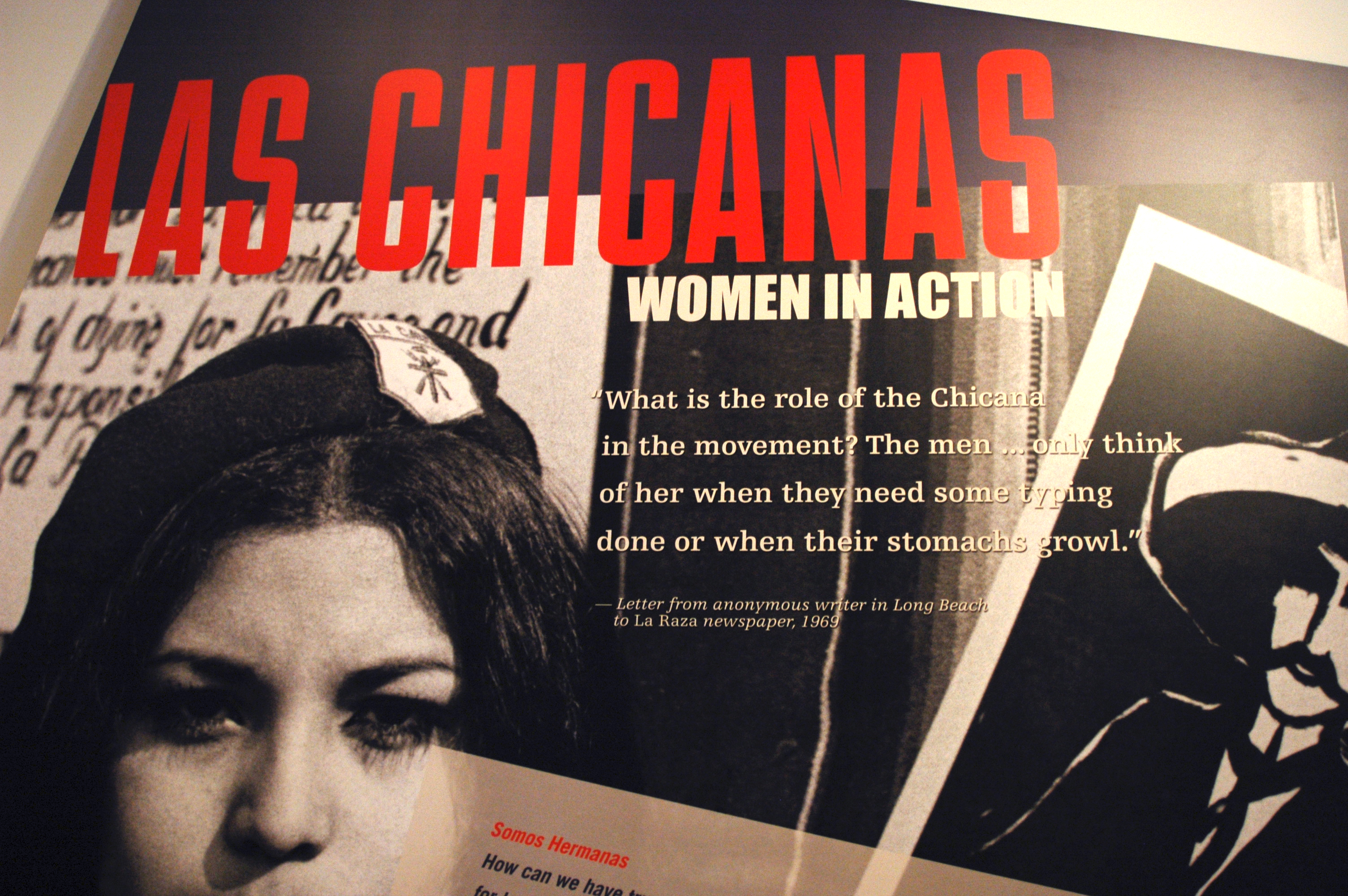
Las Chicanas Poster at LA Plaza de Cultura y Artes

Chicana feminism is a sociopolitical movement, theory, and praxis that scrutinizes the historical, cultural, spiritual, educational, and economic intersections impacting Chicanas and the Chicana/o community in the United States. Chicana feminism empowers women to challenge institutionalized social norms and regards anyone a feminist who fights for the end of women's oppression in the community.

Chicana feminism encouraged women to reclaim their existence between and among the Chicano Movement and second-wave feminist movements from the 1960s to the 1970s. Chicana feminists recognized that empowering women would empower the Chicana/o community, yet routinely faced opposition. Critical developments in the field, including from Chicana lesbian feminists, expanded limited ideas of the Chicana beyond conventional understandings.

Xicanisma formed as a significant intervention developed by Ana Castillo in 1994 to reinvigorate Chicana feminism and recognize a shift in consciousness that had occurred since the Chicano Movement, as an extension and expansion of Chicanismo. It partly inspired the formation of Xicanx identity. Chicana cultural productions, including Chicana art, literature, poetry, music, and film continue to shape Chicana feminism in new directions. Chicana feminism is often placed in conversation with decolonial feminism.

== Background ==
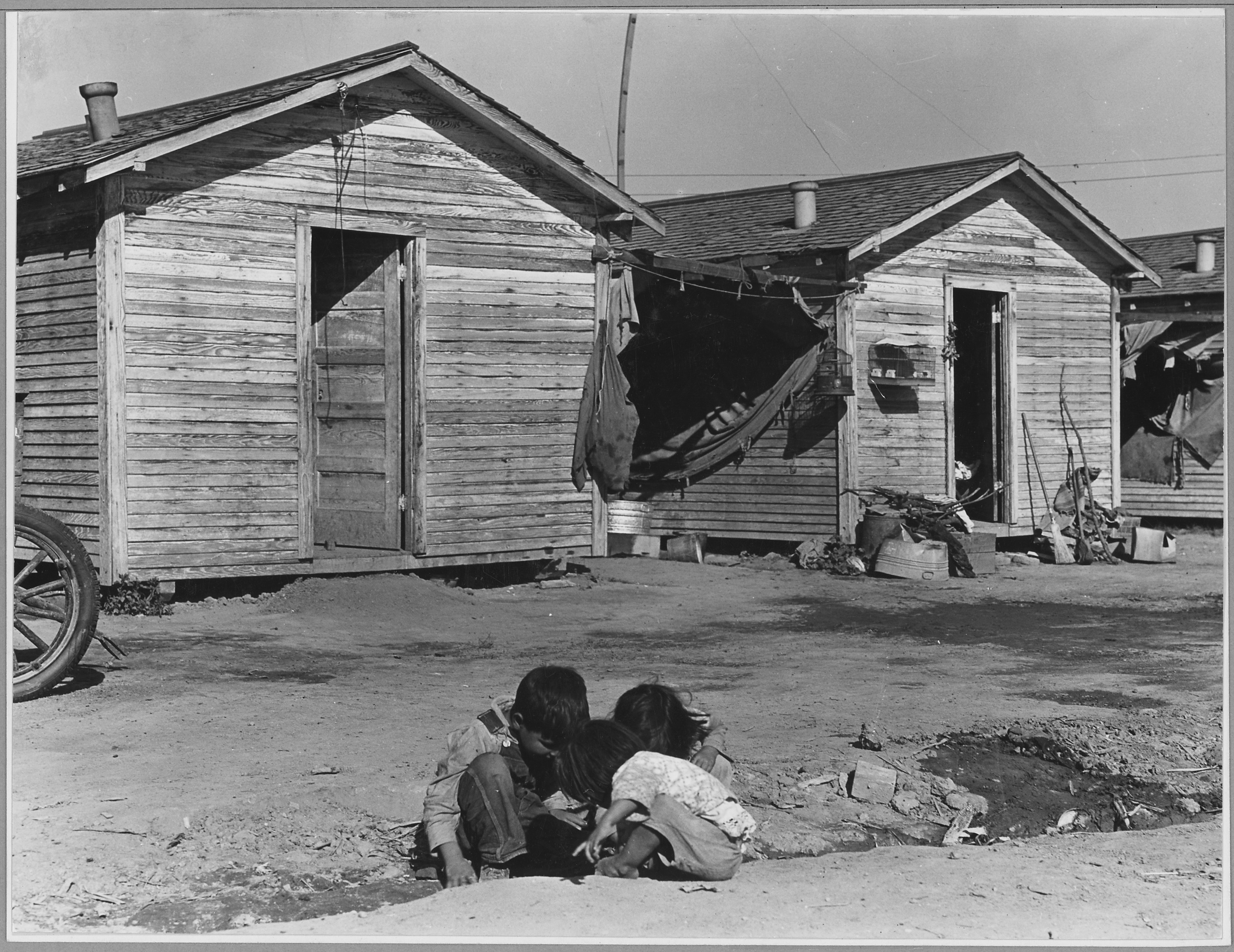
Mexican children in a segregated company housing facility in Corcoran, California (1940)

Some Mexican American women were involved in the early women's suffrage movement. In the early twentieth century, this included women such as Adelina Otero-Warren and Maria de G.E. Lopez. Otero-Warren was born in an elite Hispano family. Most Mexican Americans, especially of low-income and non-white complexion, who did not grow up in elite families were subject to much different conditions.

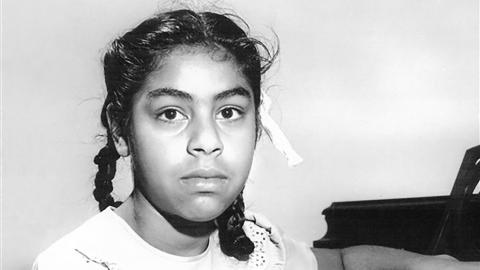
Mendez v. Westminster (1947) overturned de jure racial segregation in schools. The case was initiated when Sylvia Mendez (pictured) was turned away from enrolling at a "white school." Mexican American children, especially of darker skin, were only permitted to learn manual skills education, while white schools taught academic preparation. At the "Mexican schools," girls were only taught sewing and homemaking.

Prior to the late 1940s, Mexican American children often grew up in segregated colonias in company towns for the agricultural industry. Mexican children, especially of darker skin, were only allowed by the U.S. government to attend segregated "Mexican schools." While white schools taught academic preparation, girls at "Mexican schools" were only permitted to be taught homemaking and sewing, while boys were taught gardening and bootmaking. This maintained class and income divisions. De jure racial segregation was overturned in 1947 with Mendez vs. Westminster, yet segregation still continued in practice in many areas because of continuing racist attitudes and anti-Mexican sentiment.

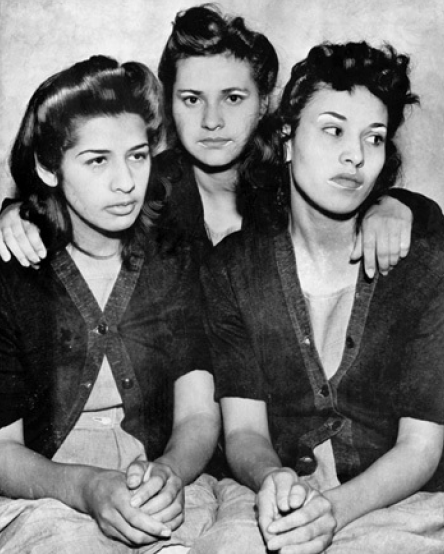
Pachucas are often ignored in narratives of Mexican American history because of their challenge to gender norms and were treated as "dangerously masculine [and] monstrously feminine."

Pachucas, who were the counterpart to Pachucos in the 1940s, have sometimes been reframed through a feminist lens because of their challenge to gender norms, especially during World War II. The Pachuca is often not a celebrated figure in Mexican American history, in Chicano cultural production, or even in Chicana feminist discourse, which has been ascribed to the way Pachucas challenged the role of the woman in the traditional family. Pachucas would often arm themselves with self-defense weapons, prepared to ward off potential attackers. The Pachuca was treated as "dangerously masculine [and] monstrously feminine." Women who reject Chicana identity and prefer to identify themselves as Hispanic may "not see or want to recognize herself" in the Pachuca figure.

Unlike women of color, white women rarely had to deal with racism. European-American or white women combated sexism in the white community through waves of feminism; the first wave addressing women's suffrage, and the second wave addressing issues of sexuality, public vs. private spheres, reproductive rights, and marital rape. However, women of color were largely excluded from these movements. This urged Chicanas who were feminists and sought to empower women to offer critiques and responses to their exclusion from both the mainstream Chicano nationalist movement and the second wave feminist movement, which formed the basis of Chicana feminism by the 1960s.

== Timeline ==
=== Chicanas in the Chicano Movement (1960s–1970s) ===
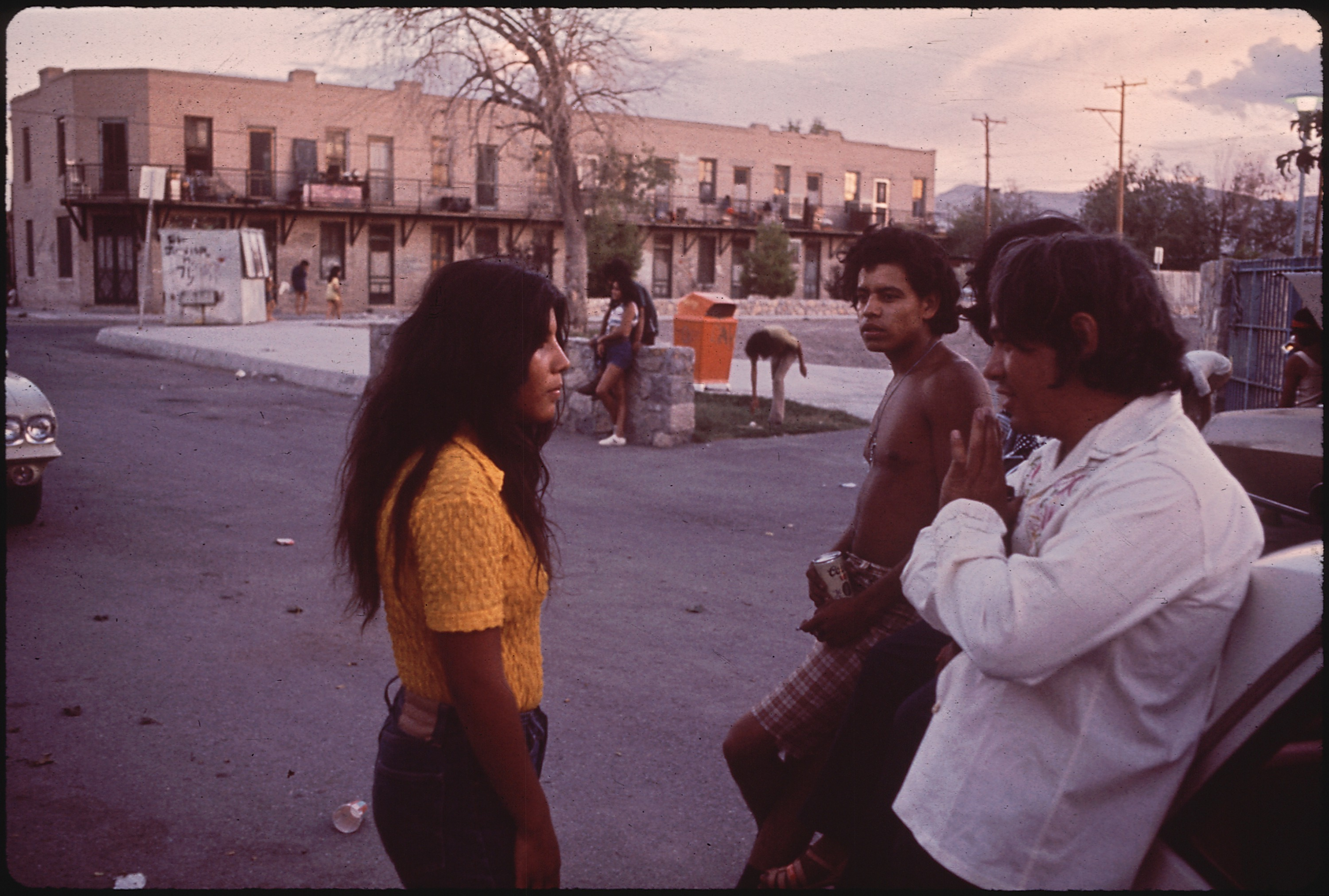
A young woman talking with a group of young men in El Segundo Barrio, El Paso (1971)

Although the Chicano Movement was organized toward empowering the greater Mexican American community, the narratives and focus of the Movement largely ignored the women that were involved with organizing during this period of civil disobedience. Throughout these events, Chicana feminists collectively realized the importance of connecting issues of gender with the other liberatory aims of the Chicano Movement.

Chicanas also renounced the mainstream second-wave feminist movement for its inability to include racism and classism in their politics. Chicanas during this time felt excluded from mainstream feminist movements because they had different needs, concerns, and demands. Through persistent objections to their exclusions, women have gone from being called Chicano women to Chicanas to introducing the adoption of a/o or o/a as a way of acknowledging both genders when discussing the community.

Alma Garcia wrote that the Chicana feminist movement was created to adhere to the specific issues which have affected Chicana women, and originated from their treatment in the Chicano Movement and second-wave feminist movements. They sought to be treated equally and be respected. The Chicana feminist movement influenced many Chicanas to be more active and to defend their rights not just as single women, but as women in solidarity who come together forming a society with equal contribution.

==== Chicana walkout organizing (1968) ====
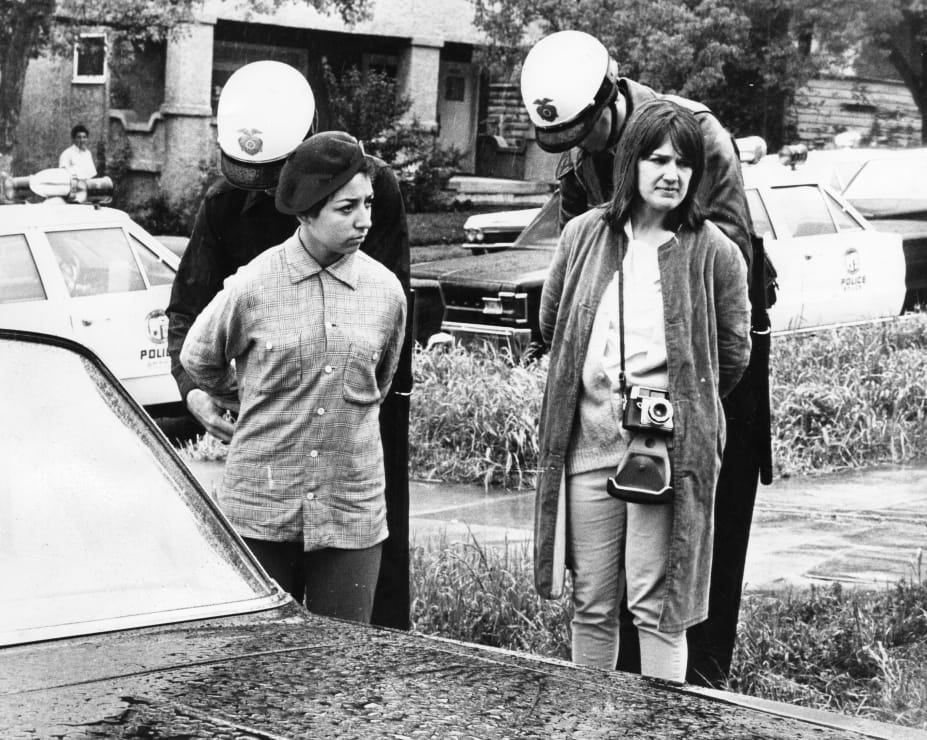
Founding co-editor of La Raza newspaper Ruth Robinson (right) with Margarita Sanchez at the Belmont High School walkout, part of a series of 1968 student protests for education reform in LA.

On March 1, 1968, approximately 15,000 students participated in what became known as the East Los Angeles School Blowouts. Chicano students across seven high schools in the East Los Angeles marched out of their schools in a coordinated protest. Students organized over shared complaints about racism, inadequate funding, and the neglect of Mexican history and culture within current education systems. Male participants of the walkouts received most of the media attention, primarily the thirteen male student organizers who were detained and imprisoned on conspiracy accusations. Dolores Delgado Bernal, a Chicana researcher, claims that by concentrating only on male students, the participation and leadership of girls and women were severely reduced and the efforts required to organize the walkouts were minimized.

Later in the mid-1990s, Dolores Delgado Bernal interviewed eight significant female walkout participants or leaders, bringing attention to the women the media had ignored: Celeste Baca, Vickie Castro, Paula Crisostomo, Mita Cuaron, Tanya Luna Mount, Rosalinda M. González, Rachael Ochoa Cervera, and Cassandra Zacarías. The oral histories of these women revealed that they organized community meetings, established connections, between students across various schools and organizations, and published underground newspapers to spread the word of the movement and recruit more student participation and support.

==== National Chicana Conference (1971) ====
A year after the walkouts, the Chicano Youth Liberation Conference was held in 1969. About 1,500 Mexican American teenagers from throughout the country attended the conference, which led to the branding of the words "Chicanismo," "El Plan Espiritual de Aztlán," and MEChA, the nationwide student organization. At the conference, a workshop was arranged to discuss the role of women in the movement and to address feminist concerns. However, the workshop concluded that, "It was the consensus of the group that the Chicana woman does not want to be liberated." Many scholars such as Anna Nieto-Gómez, find this statement to be one of the decisive actions that sparked the Chicana Feminist Movement.

Following this statement, the first National Chicana Conference was held in Houston, Texas in May 1971. The conference attracted over 600 women from all over the United States to discuss issues regarding equal access to education, reproductive justice, formation of childcare centers, and more. The conference was organized into nine different workshops: "Sex and the Chicana: Noun and Verb," "Choices for Chicanas: Education and Occupation," "Marriage: Chicana-Style," "Religion," "Feminist Movement - Do We Have a Place in It?," "Exploitation of Women - The Chicana Perspective," "Women in Politics - Is Anyone There," "Militancy/Conservatism: Which Way Is Forward," and "De Colores y Clases: Class and Ethnic Differences."

While the event was the first major gathering of its kind, the conference itself was fraught with discord as Chicanas from geographically and ideologically divergent positions sparred over the role of feminism within the Chicano movement. These conflicts led to a walkout on the final day of the conference. According to Anna Nieto-Gómez, "the walkout distinguished the conflict between Chicana feminists and loyalists."

==== Viewed as traitors to the Movement ====
Described as "vendida logic" by scholar Maylei Blackwell, Chicana feminists were often accused of being "vendidas" or traitors to the Chicano movement, described as anti-family, anti-man, and anti-Chicano movement. Alongside vendida, Chicana feminists were called "women's libber," "agringadas," or lesbians. Chicanas who prioritized the Chicano movement and cause were known as Loyalists.

Women also sought to battle the internalized struggles of self-hatred rooted in the colonization of their people. This included breaking the mujer buena/mujer mala myth, in which the domestic Spanish Woman is viewed as good and the Indigenous Woman that is a part of the community is viewed as bad. Chicana feminist thought emerged as a response to patriarchy, racism, classism, and colonialism as well as a response to all the ways that these legacies of oppression have become internalized.

==== Chicanas in la familia ====
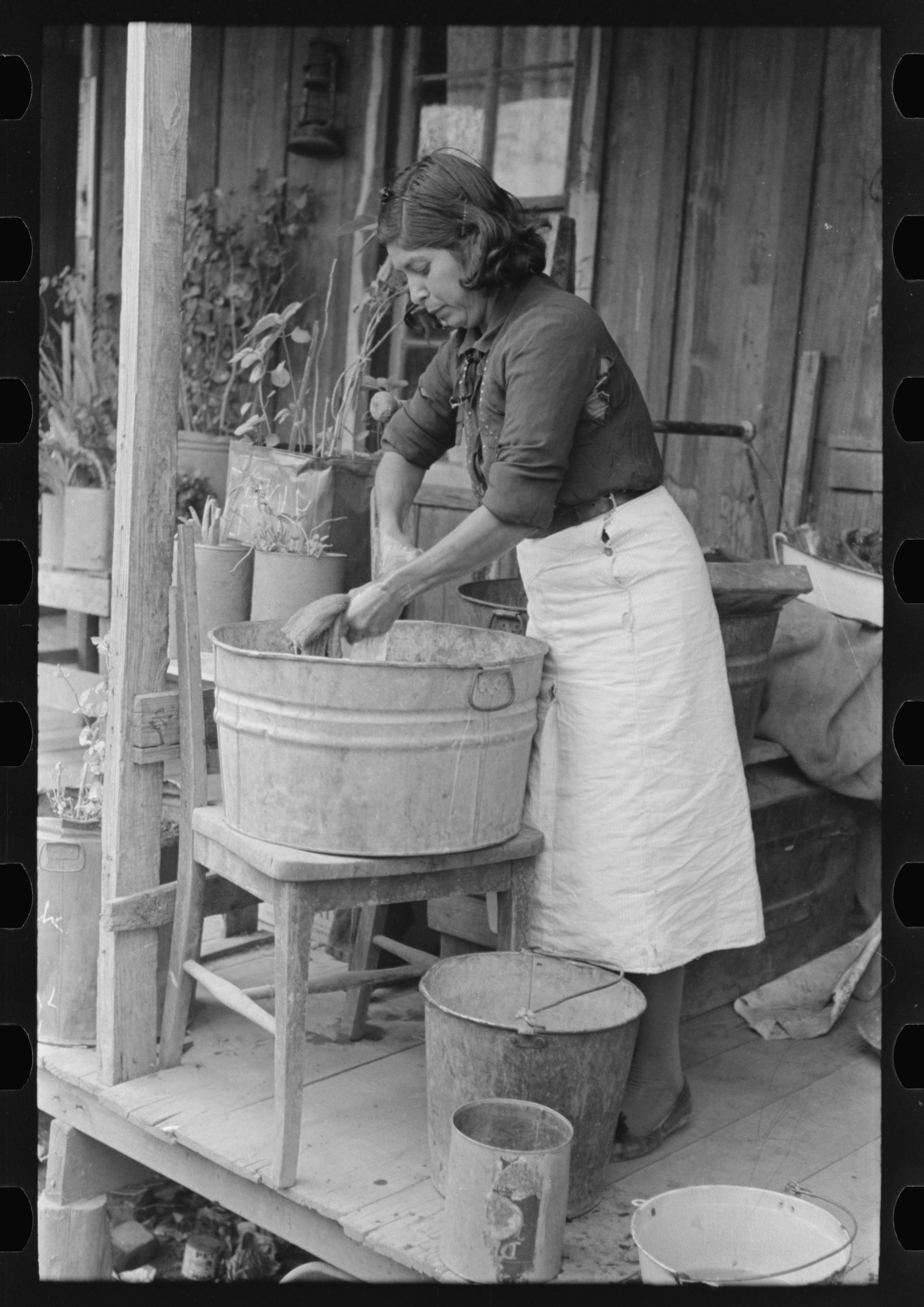
Mexican American woman washing clothes in San Antonio, Texas (1944)

Chicana feminists challenged their prescribed role in la familia, and demanded to have the intersectional experiences that they faced recognized. Chicanas identify as being consciously aware, self-determined, and proud of their roots, heritage, and experience while prioritizing La Raza. With the emergence of the Chicano Movement, the structure of Chicano families saw dramatic changes. Specifically, women began to question the positives and negatives of the established family dynamic and where their place was within the Chicano national struggle.

Chicanas were not only experienced the effects of racism and imperialism in white America, but also sexism within their own families. In the seminal text "La Chicana", Elizabeth Martinez, asserts that: "[La Chicana] is oppressed by the forces of racism, imperialism, and sexism. This can be said of all non-white women in the United States. Her oppression by the forces of racism and imperialism is similar to that endured by our men. Oppression by sexism, however, is hers alone."

==== Chicana labor organizing ====
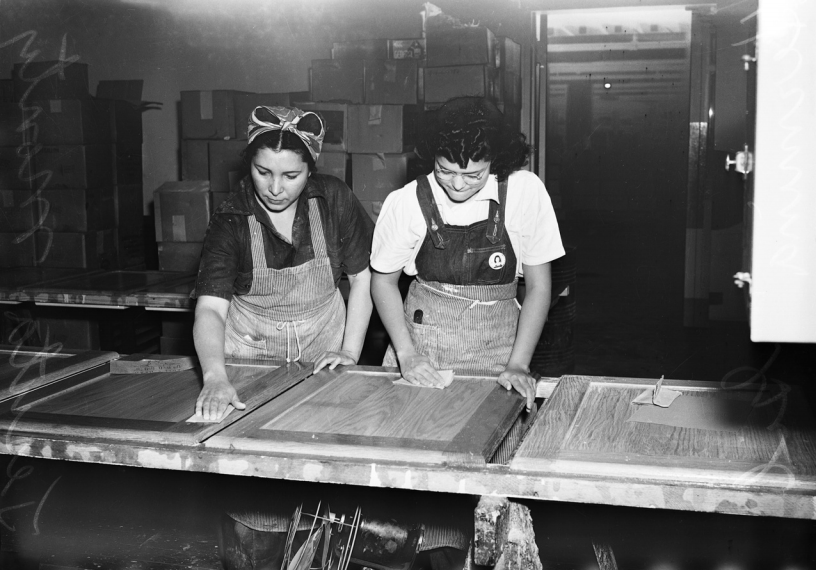
Mexican American women working at Friedrich Air Conditioning (1942)

Emma Tenayuca was an early Mexican American labor organizer and Dolores Huerta was a major force in the labor organization of farmworkers. The testimony of the migrant farm worker activist Maria Elena Lucas reveals the enormous difficulties of organizing farmworkers.

The Farah Strike, 1972–1974, labeled the "strike of the century," was organized and led by Mexican American women predominantly in El Paso, Texas. Employees of the Farah Manufacturing Company went on strike to stand for job security and their right to establish and join a union.

==== Chicana Feminist Organizations (1960s–1970s) ====
One of the first Chicana organizations was the East Los Angeles Chicana Welfare Rights Organization, founded by Alicia Escalante in 1967. She became a vocal representative of East Los Angeles at campaign meetings where no one else from the neighborhood was present. She spoke out against the dehumanization of welfare recipients, particularly of Chicana and Black women. In a 1968 article for La Raza newspaper, she wrote that the state believed that welfare recipients "should be ashamed of yourselves for living." She organized to protest the slashing of welfare funds for essential needs that were labeled as "special needs" by the state.

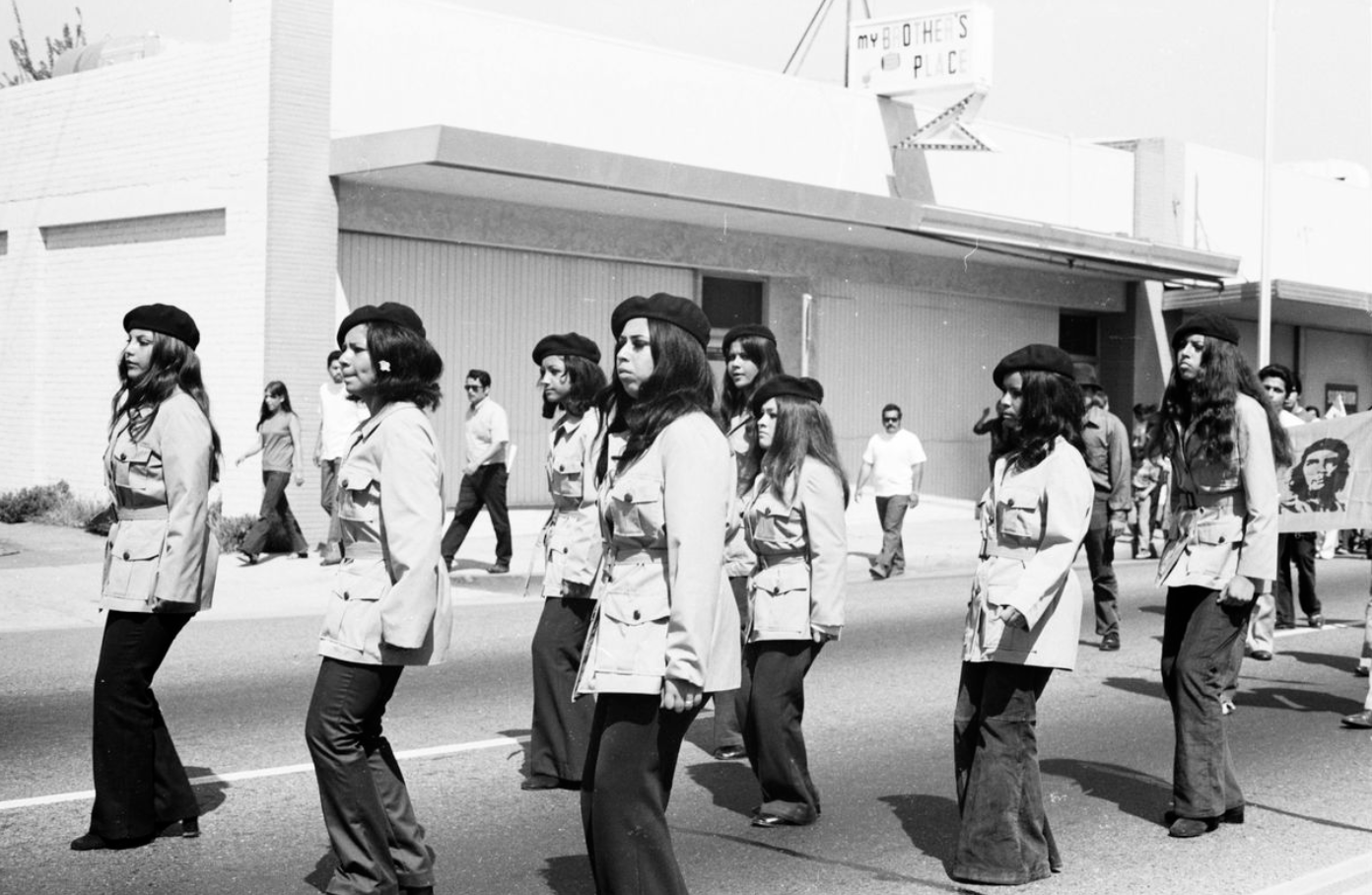
Chicana Brown Berets (1970)

The Brown Berets were a youth group that took on a more militant approach to organizing for the Mexican-American community formed in California in the late 1960s. They heavily valued strong bonds between women, stating that women Berets must acknowledge other women in the organization as hermanas en la lucha and encouraging them to stand together. Membership in the Brown Berets helped to give Chicanas autonomy, and the ability to express their own political views without fear. An important Chicana in the Brown Berets was Gloria Arellanes, the only female minister of the Brown Berets.

The Hijas de Cuauhtémoc began as an activist rap group and would later become a feminist newspaper by 1971. There was a focus on Mexican feminism that would stand for people on either side of the border. The newspaper included topics such as: "gender equality and liberatory ethics to relationships, sexuality, power, women's status, labor and leadership, familial bonds, and organizational structures."

The Comisión Femenil Mexicana Nacional (CFMN) was founded in 1973. The concept for the CFMN originated during the National Chicano Issues Conference when a group of attending Chicanas noticed that their concerns were not adequately addressed at the Chicano conference. The women met outside of the conference and drafted a framework for the CFMN that established them as active and knowledgeable community leaders of a people's movement.

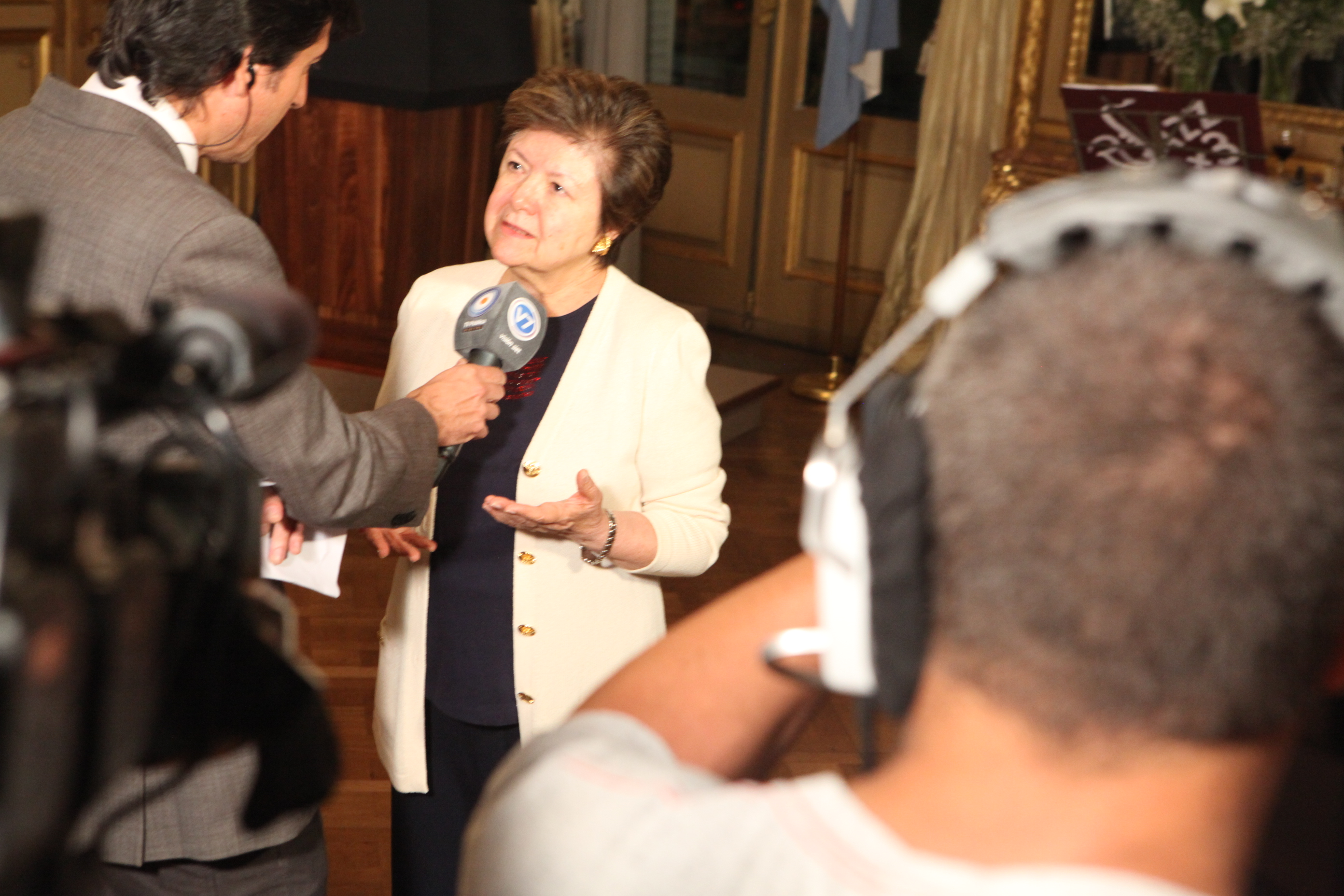
Vilma Martinez (pictured) established the Chicana Rights Project in 1974.

The Chicana Rights Project was created in 1974 as a Chicana feminist legal organization to defend the legal rights of Mexican American women. It was initiated by Vilma Martinez and addressed issues of employment, health, education, and housing rights for Chicanas. It monitored the implementation of the Comprehensive Employment and Training Act (CETA), which successfully led to an increase in Chicana women in San Antonio's programs. The organization also filed lawsuits for the sterilization abuses of Latina women in Texas. It made a difference in the lives of thousands of women. The organization came to an end in 1983.

=== Critical developments (Late 1970s–1980s) ===
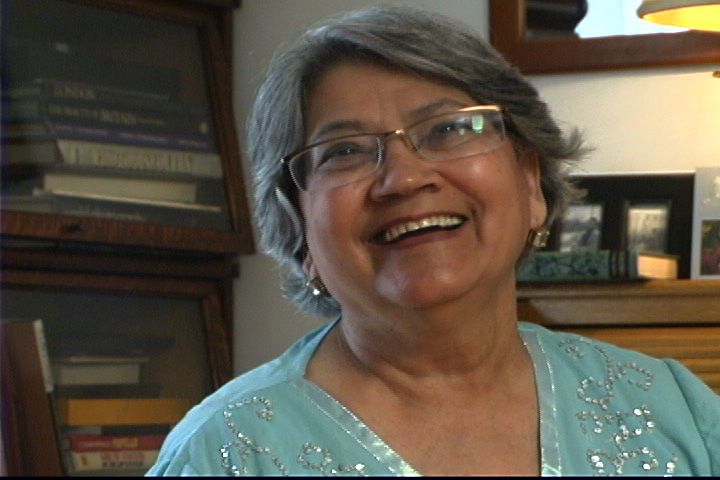
Martha P. Cotera who authored Diosa y Hembra (1976) and The Chicana Feminist (1977)

From the late 1970s to the early 1990s, Chicana feminism made significant developments in the forging of Chicana critical consciousness via numerous foundational texts covering Chicana lives and experiences. Many of these works covered themes that had not been examined in depth, including sexuality, gender roles, reproductive rights, sexual violence, environmental racism, and queer of color critique.

However, despite the critical importance of these texts, many continued to be left out of critical discourse in Chicana/o studies for decades, and are still often ignored. This indicated a lagging refusal of masculine-focused Chicanismo to shift its views and grant serious attention to Chicana discourses. Major texts associated with this period that are foundational to Chicana/o studies, despite not always acknowledged, include:

- Diosa y Hembra: The History and Heritage of Chicanas in the U.S. (1976) by Martha P. Cotera
- The Chicana Feminist (1977) by Martha P. Cotera
- Essays on La Mujer (1977) ed. by Rosaura Sánchez and Rosa Martinez Cruz
- Mexican Women in the United States (1980) by Magdalena Mora and Adelaida R. Del Castillo
- This Bridge Called My Back (1981) ed. by Gloria Anzaldúa and Cherríe Moraga
- Loving in the War Years: Lo Que Nunca Pasó Por Sus Labios (1983) by Cherríe Moraga
- Borderlands/La Frontera: The New Mestiza (1987) by Gloria Anzaldúa
- Companeras: Latina Lesbians (1987) ed. by Juanita Ramos
- The Sexuality of Latinas (1989) ed. by Norma Alarcon, Ana Castillo, and Cherrie Moraga
- Chicana Lesbians: The Girls Our Mothers Warned Us About (1991) ed. by Carla Trujillo

=== Xicanisma (1990s–Present) ===
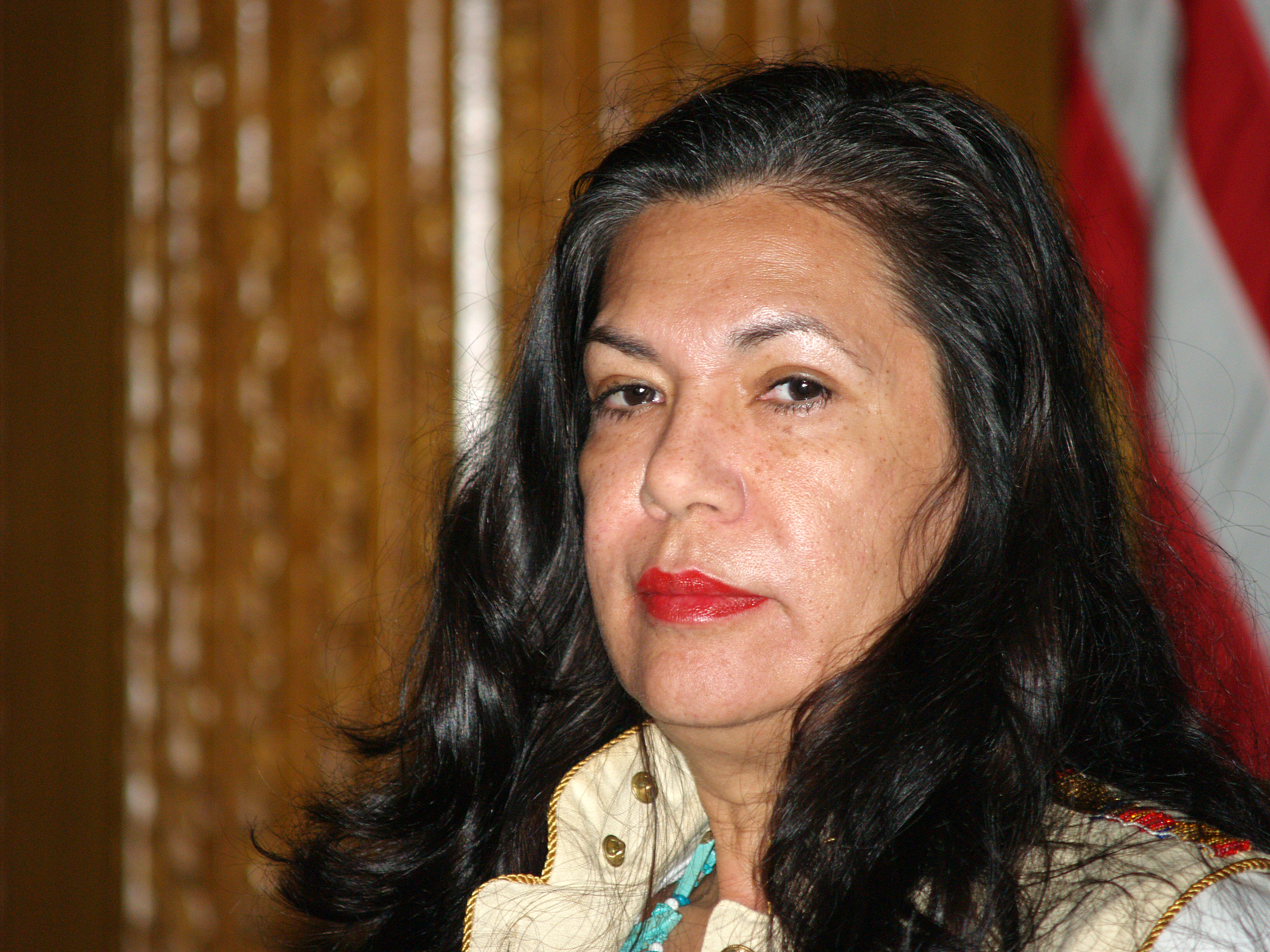
Ana Castillo developed Xicanisma to reinvigorate Chicana feminism and reflect a shift in consciousness since the Chicano Movement.

Xicanisma is an intervention in Chicana feminism proposed by Ana Castillo in Massacre of the Dreamers (1994). The use of the X is a reference to the Spanish colonizers being unable to pronounce the Sh sound in Mesoamerican languages (such as Texcoco, which is pronounced Tesh-KOH-koh) and so they represented this sound with a letter X in the 16th-century Spanish language. The X in Xicanisma refers to this colonial encounter between the Spanish and Indigenous peoples by reclaiming the X as a literal symbol of being at a crossroads or otherwise embodying hybridity.

The X in Xicanisma is not only a letter, but a symbol of being or existing at a crossroads.

This crossroads or X is a reference to Indigenous survival after hundreds of years of colonization. It acknowledges the moment "where the creative power of woman became deliberately appropriated by the male society" through the coloniality of gender being imposed onto women. Xicanisma speaks to the need to not only reclaim one's Indigenous roots and spirituality, but to "reinsert the forsaken feminine into our consciousness" that was subordinated through colonization. It therefore challenges the masculine-focused aspects of the movement and the patriarchal bias of the Spanish language: being Xicanisma rather than Chicanismo.

Castillo argued that using this X as a symbol of a crossroads was important because "language is the vehicle by which we perceive ourselves in relation to the world." The implication is that if we change the language we use to understand ourselves, we can change how we view and act in the world. The goal of Xicanisma for Castillo is not to replace patriarchy with matriarchy, but to create "a nonmaterialistic and nonexploitative society in which feminine principles of nurturing and community prevail" and where the feminine is recovered from its current place of subordination enforced through the coloniality of gender.

== Themes ==
Issues of self-image have been explored in Latin American feminism more broadly.

There are many central themes of Chicana feminism that have been developed by Chicanas. Chicana feminism serves to highlight a much greater movement than generally perceived; a variety of minority groups are given a platform to confront their oppressors whether that be racism, homophobia, and multiple other forms of social injustice. Chicana liberation unshackles individuals, as well as the broader group as a whole, allowing them to live lives as they desire – commanding cultural respect and equality. Resilience is an overarching theme of Chicana feminism: the strength it takes to not only divide but bring forth a new mindset of equality.

=== Female archetypes ===
Central to much of Chicana feminism is a reclaiming of the female archetypes La Virgen de Guadalupe, La Llorona, and La Malinche. These archetypes have prevented Chicanas from achieving sexual and bodily agency due to the ways they have been historically constructed as negative categories through the lenses of patriarchy and colonialism. Shifting the discourse from a traditional (patriarchal) representation of these archetypes to a decolonial feminist understanding of them is a crucial element of contemporary Chicana feminism, and represents the starting point for a reclamation of Chicana female power, sexuality, and spirituality. Gloria Anzaldúa's canonical text Borderlands/La Frontera addresses the subversive power of reclaiming Indigenous spirituality to unlearn colonial and patriarchal constructions and restrictions on women, their sexuality, and their understandings of motherhood: "I will no longer be made to feel ashamed of existing. I will have my voice: Indian, Spanish, white."

==== Figure of La Virgen de Guadalupe ====
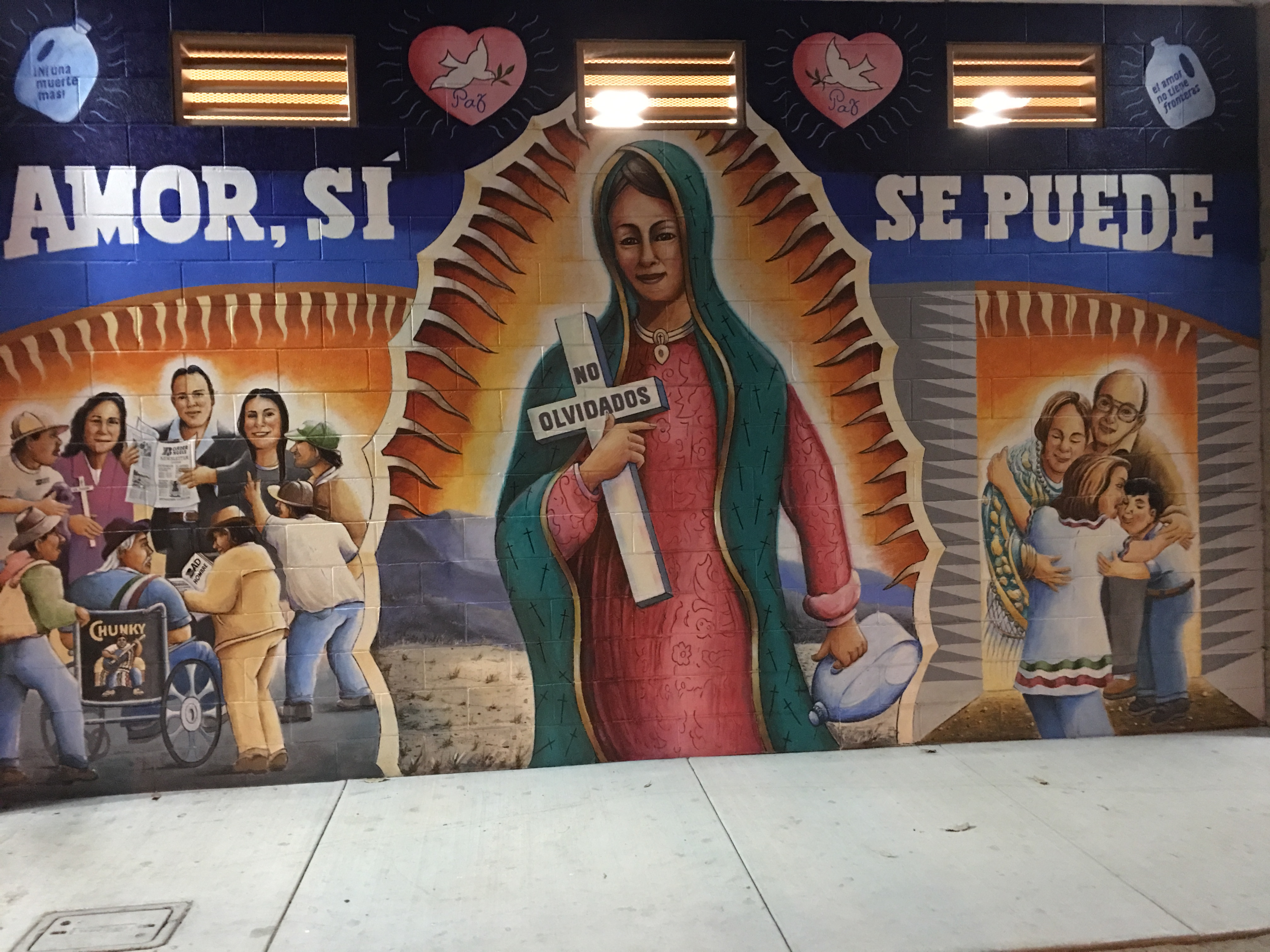
La Virgen de Guadalupe has been upheld in Chicano and Mexican communities as a symbol of chastity and virtuous motherhood, which are construed as defining characteristics of a woman's worth or status.

La Virgen de Guadalupe, in the Catholic faith, has long been looked to as an exemplary figure of female sexual purity and motherhood, especially in Mexican and Chicano culture. Members of the Chicana feminist movement, such as artist Yolanda Lopez, sought to reclaim the image of La Virgen and deconstruct the ideal that virginity is the only measurement for determining a woman's worth and virtue. For women like Lopez, the image of Guadalupe possessed a significance that was not pertinent to religion at all.

The figure of La Virgen de Guadalupe is often contrasted with La Malinche, which suppresses Chicana women's sexuality through the patriarchal dichotomy of puta/virgin: the positive role model and the negative one. These figures are historically and continuously held up before Mexican women and Chicanas as icons and mirrors in which to examine their own self-image and define their self-esteem.

==== Figure of La Malinche ====
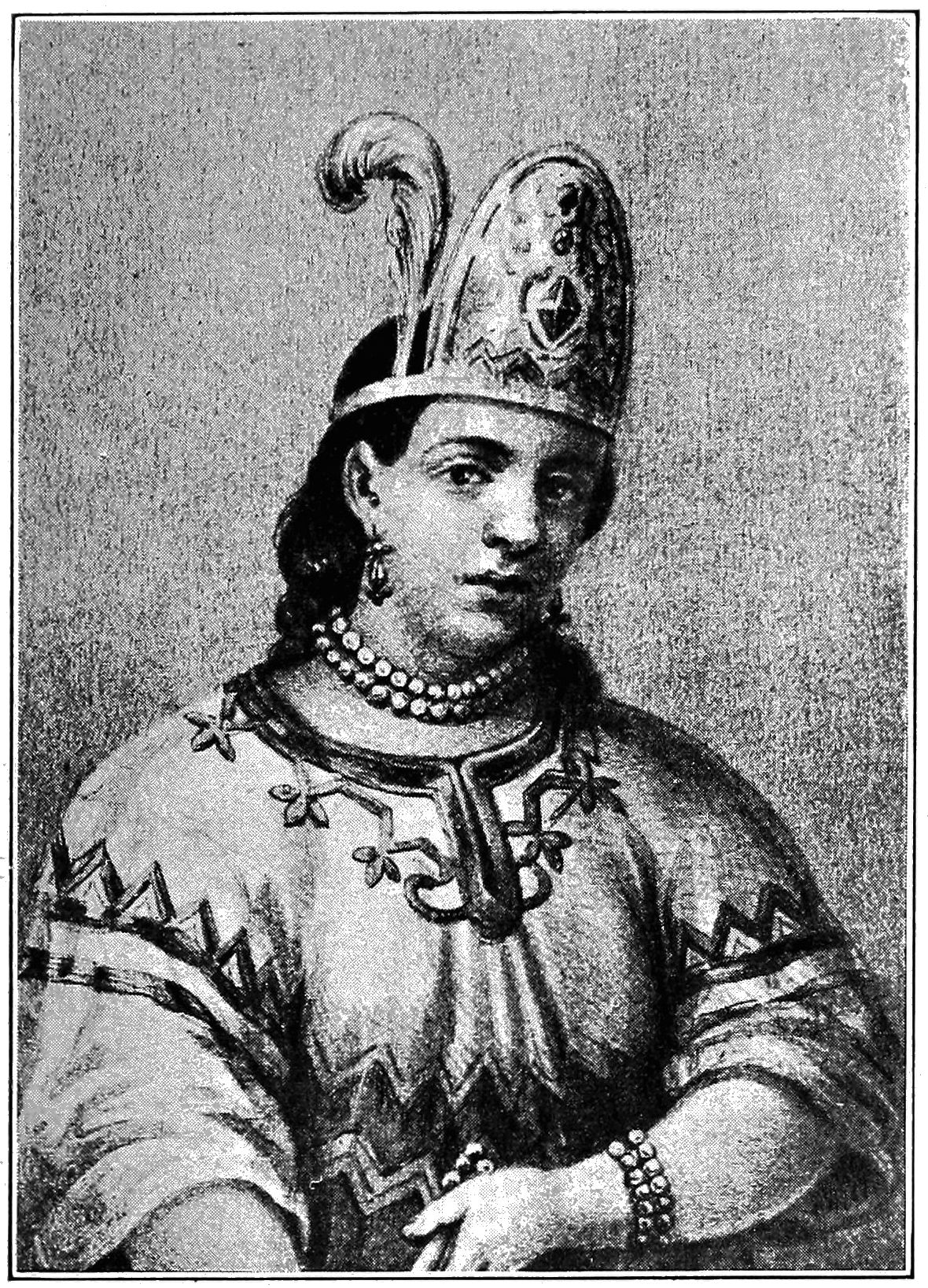
The figure of Malintzin has been used in Chicano and Mexican communities as a symbol to suppress women's liberation, by framing feminism or sexual expression as inherently traitorous.

Malintzin (also known as Doña Marina by the Spaniards or "La Malinche" post-Mexican independence from Spain) was born around 1505 to noble Indigenous parents in rural Mexico. Since Indigenous women were often used as pawns for political alliances at this time, she was betrayed by her mother and her mother's second husband and sold into slavery to the Mayans to save the inheritance for her newborn brother. Between the ages of 12–14, traded to Hernan Cortés as a concubine, and because of her intelligence and fluency in multiple languages, was promoted to his "wife" and diplomat. She served as Cortés's translator, playing a key role in the Spaniard's conquest of Tenochtitlan and, by extension, the conquest of the Aztec Empire. She bore Cortés a son, Martín, who is considered to be the first mestizo and the beginning of the "Mexican" race.

After Mexico gained independence from Spain in 1821, a scapegoat was needed to justify centuries of colonial rule. Because of Malintzin's relationship with Cortés and her role as translator and informant in Spain's conquest of Mexico, she was seen as a traitor to her race. By contrast, Chicana feminism calls for a different understanding. Since nationalism was a concept unknown to Indigenous people in the 16th century, Malintzin had no sense of herself as "Indian," making it impossible for her to show ethnic loyalty or conscientiously act as a traitor. Malintzin was one of millions of women who were traded and sold in Mexico pre-colonization. With no way to escape a group of men, and inevitably rape, Malintzin showed loyalty to Cortés to ensure her survival.

La Malinche has become the representative of a female sexuality that is passive, "rape-able," and always guilty of betrayal. Rather than a traitor or a "whore," Chicana feminism calls for an understanding of her as an agent within her limited means, resisting rape and torture (as was common among her peers) by becoming a partner and translator to Cortés. Placing the blame for Mexico's conquest on Malintzin creates a foundation for placing upon women the responsibility to be the moral compasses of society and blames them for their sexuality, which is counterintuitive. It is important to understand Malintzin as a victim not of Cortés, but of myth. Chicana feminism calls for an understanding in which she should be praised for the adaptive resistance she exhibited that ultimately led to her survival.

By challenging patriarchal and colonial representations, Chicana writers re-construct their relationship to the figure of La Malinche and these other powerful archetypes, and reclaim them in order to re-frame a spirituality and identity that is both decolonizing and empowering. La Malinche is a victim of centuries of patriarchal myths that permeate the Mexican woman's consciousness, often without her awareness.

==== Figure of La Llorona ====
La Llorona known as the legend of a vengeful mother who drowned her children after discovering the infidelity of her husband. Her spirit is said to haunt bodies of water. The folklore is told from one generation to the next and has been reinvented by Chicano culture mist the rise of Chicana feminism. La Llorona was reimagined to be a heroic figure of strength in which Chicana women could relate to and identify with. The legend of La Llorona, who was once seen as a monstrous mother has now been shared by many Chicana artists and writers from a different perspective in which they see themselves in La Llorona. Chicana writers have used this figure to challenge the patriarchal ideals that men outside and within their culture have placed on Chicanas. The folklore of a tragedy has been reinvented to be a guidance through the oppression Chicana women face.

=== Duality and "The New Mestiza" ===
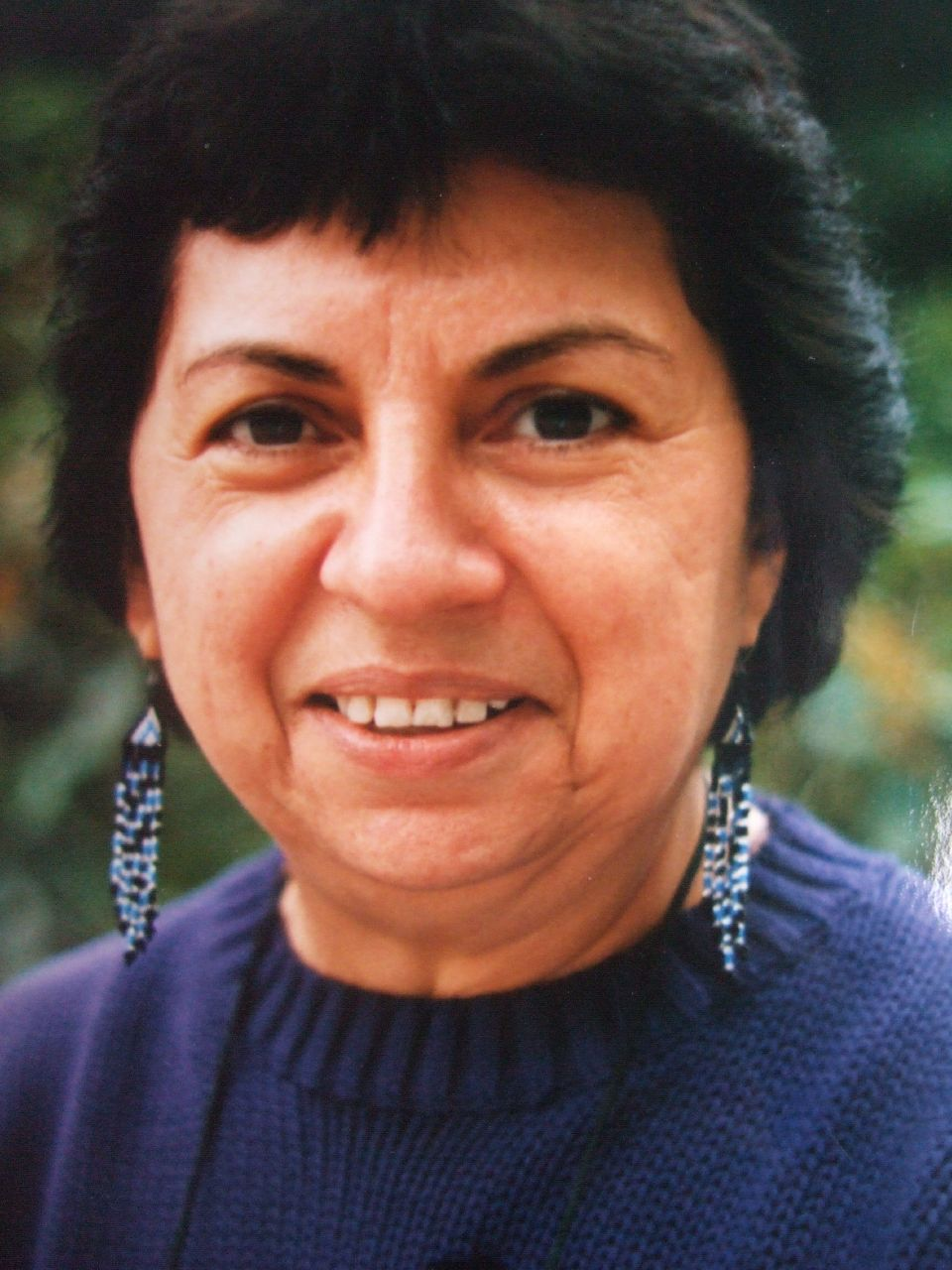
Gloria Evangelina Anzaldúa's (September 26, 1942 – May 15, 2004) works and theories were foundational to a resurgence in Chicana feminism.

The concept of "The New Mestiza" comes from feminist author Gloria Anzaldúa. In her book, Borderlands/La Frontera: The New Mestiza, she writes: "In a constant state of mental nepantilism, an Aztec word meaning torn between ways, la mestiza is a product of the transfer of the cultural and spiritual values of one group to another. Being tricultural, monolingual, bilingual or multilingual, speaking a patois, and in a state of perpetual transition, the mestiza faces the dilemma of the mixed breed: which collectivity does the daughter of a dark-skinned mother listen to? [...] Within us and within la Cultura Chicana, commonly held beliefs of the white culture attack commonly held beliefs of the Mexican culture, and both attack commonly held beliefs of the indigenous culture. Subconsciously, we see an attack on ourselves and our beliefs as a threat and we attempt to block with a counterstance."

Anzaldúa presents a mode of being for Chicanas that honors their unique standpoint and lived experience. This theory of embodiment offers a mode of being for Chicanas who are constantly negotiating hybridity and cultural collision, and the ways that inform the way they are continuously making new knowledge and understandings of self, often time concerning intersecting and various forms of oppression. This theory discloses how a counter-stance cannot be a way of life because it depends on hegemonic constructions of domination, in terms of race, nationality, and culture. A counter-stance locks one into a duel of oppressor and oppressed; locked in mortal combat, like the cop and the criminal, both are reduced to a common denominator of violence.

Being solely reactionary means nothing is being created, revived, or renewed in place of the dominant culture and that the dominant culture must remain dominant for counterstance to exist. For Anzaldua and this theory of embodiment, there must be space to create something new. The "new mestiza" was a canonical text that redefined what it meant to be Chicana. In this theory, being Chicana entails hybridity, contradictions, tolerance for ambiguity, and plurality, nothing is rejected or excluded from histories and legacies of oppression. Further, this theory of embodiment calls for synthesizing all aspects of identity and creating new meanings, not simply balancing or coming together of different aspects of identity.

=== Mujerista ===
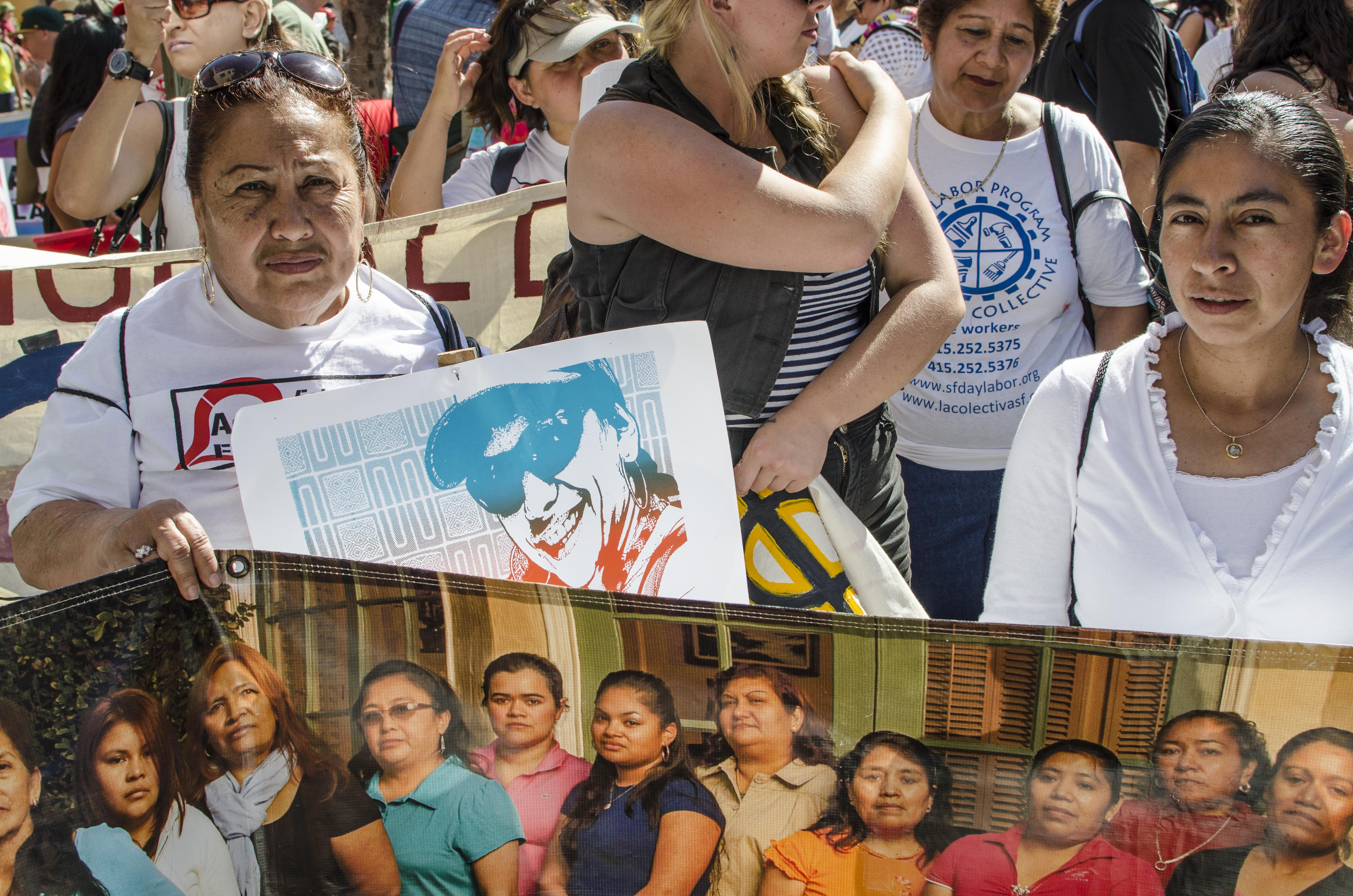
International Workers' Day (2014) in Oakland, California

The term mujerista was defined by Ada María Isasi-Díaz in 1996 and was largely influenced by the African American women's "Womanist" approach proposed by Alice Walker. This Latina feminist identity draws from the main ideas of womanism by combating inequality and oppression through participation in social justice movements within the Latina/o community. Mujerismo is rooted in the relationships built with the community and emphasizes individual experiences in relation to "communal struggles" to redefine the Latina/o identity.

Mujerismo represents the body of knowledge while Mujerista refers to the individual who identifies with these beliefs. The origins of these terms began with Gloria Anzaldúa's This Bridge We Call Home (1987), Ana Castillo's Massacre of the Dreamer: Essays in Xicanisma (1994), and Gloria Anzaldúa and Cherríe Moraga's This Bridge Called My Back (1984). Mujerista is a Latina-oriented "womanist" approach to everyday life and relationships. It emphasizes the need to connect the formal, public life of work and education with the private life of culture and the home by privileging cultural experiences. As such, it differs from Feminista which focuses on the historic context of the feminist movement. To be Mujerista is to integrate body, emotion, spirit and community into a single identity. Mujerismo recognizes how personal experiences are valuable sources of knowledge. The development of all these components form a foundation for collective action in the form of activism.

=== Nepantla spirituality ===
Nepantla is often associated with author Chicana feminist Gloria Anzaldúa, who coined the term, "Nepantlera." Nepantla is a Nahua word which translates to "in the middle of it" or "middle". Nepantla can be described as a concept or spirituality in which multiple realities are experienced at the same time (duality). As a Chicana, understanding and having indigenous ancestral knowledge of spirituality plays an instrumental role in the path to healing, decolonization, cultural appreciation, self-understanding, and self-love. "Nepantleras are threshold people; they move within and among multiple, often conflicting, worlds and refuse to align themselves exclusively with any single individual, group, or belief system." Nepantla is a mode of being for the Chicana and informs the way she experiences the world and various systems of oppression.

=== Body politics ===
Encarnación: Illness and Body Politics in Chicana Feminist Literature by Suzanne Bost discusses how Chicana feminism has changed the way Chicana women look at body politics. Feminism has moved beyond just looking at identity politics, it now looks at how "[...]the intersections between particular bodies, cultural contexts, and political needs". It now looks beyond just race, and incorporates intersectionality, and how mobility, accessibility, ability, caregivers and their roles in lives, work with the body of Chicanas. Examples of Frida Kahlo and her abilities are discussed, as well as Gloria Anzaldúa's diabetes, to illustrated how ability must be discussed when talking about identity. Bost writes that "Since there is no single or constant locus of identification, our analyses must adapt to different cultural frameworks, shifting feelings, and matter that is fluid.[...] our thinking about bodies, identities, and politics must keep moving." Bost uses examples of contemporary Chicana artists and literature to illustrate this: Chicana feminism has not ended; it is just manifesting in different ways now.

=== Queer interventions ===
Chicana feminist theory evolved as a theory of embodiment and a theory of flesh due to the canonical works of Gloria Anzaldúa and Cherrie Moraga, both of whom identify as queer. Queer interventions in Chicana feminist thought called for the inclusion and the honoring of the cultures' jotería. In La Conciencia de la Mestiza, Anzaldúa writes that "the mestizo and the queer exist at this time and point on the evolutionary continuum for a purpose. We are blending that proves that all blood is intricately woven together and that we are spawned out of similar souls." This intervention centers queerness as a focal part of liberation, a lived experience that cannot be ignored or excluded.

In Queer Aztlán: the Reformation of Chicano Tribe, Cherríe Moraga questions the construction of Chicano identity in relation with queerness. Offering a critique of the exclusion of people of color from mainstream gay movements as well as the homophobia rampant in Chicano nationalist movements. Moraga also discusses Aztlán, the metaphysical land and nation that belongs to Chicano ideologies, as well as how the ideas within the communidad need to move forward into making new forms of culture and community in order to survive. "Feminist critics are committed to the preservation of Chicano culture, but we know that our culture will not survive marital rape, battering, incest, drug and alcohol abuse, AIDS, and the marginalization of lesbian daughters and gay sons." Moraga brings up criticisms of the Chicano Movement and how it has been ignoring the issues within the movement itself, and that needs to be addressed in order for the culture to be preserved.

=== Chicana lesbian feminism ===
In Chicana Lesbians: Fear and Loathing in the Chicano Community Carla Trujillo discusses how being a Chicana lesbian is incredibly difficult due to their culture's expectations on family and heteronormativity. Chicana lesbians who become mothers break this expectation and become liberated from the social norms of their culture. Trujillo argues that the lesbian existence itself disrupts an established norm of patriarchal oppression. She argues that Chicana lesbians are perceived as a threat because they challenge a male dominated Chicano movement; they raise the consciousness of many Chicana women regarding independence. She goes on to say that Chicanas, whether they are lesbian or not, are taught to conform to certain modes of behavior regarding their sexuality: women are "taught to suppress our sexual desires and needs by conceding all pleasures to the male."

In 1991, Carla Trujillo edited and compiled, the anthology Chicana Lesbians: The Girls Our Mothers Warned Us About (1991), published by Third Woman Press. This anthology featured cover art by Ester Hernandez titled "La Ofrenda." Vincent Carillo argued that the piece challenged conventional depictions of Chicanas and gendered dynamics. This anthology included poetry and essays by Chicana women creating new understandings of self through their sexuality and race.

== Chicana art ==
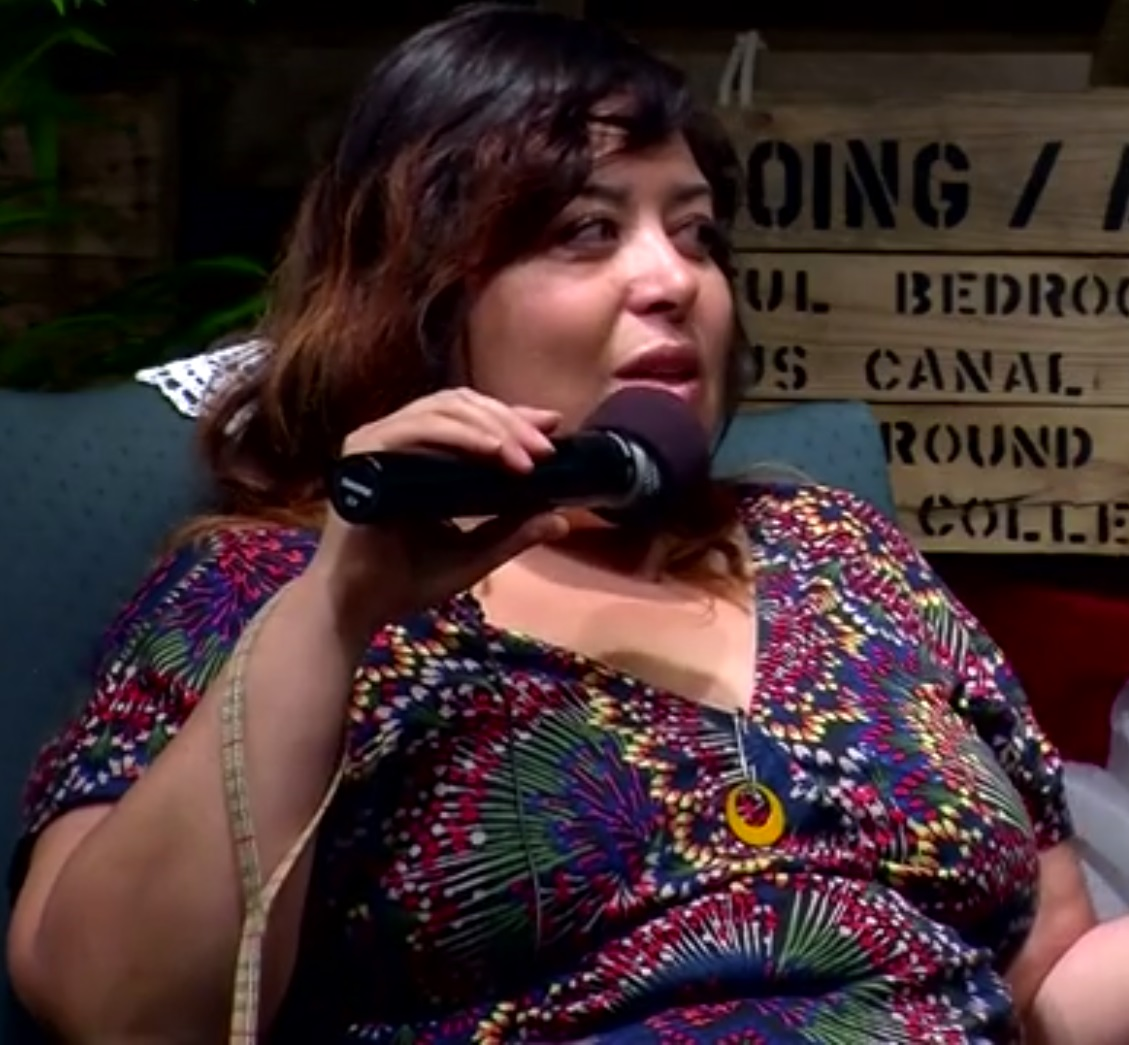
Chicana interdisciplinary artist Nao Bustamante during an interview (2012)

Art gives Chicana women a platform to voice their unique challenges and experiences, such as artists Ester Hernandez and Judithe Hernandez. During the Chicano Movement, Chicanas used art to express their political and social resistance. Through different art mediums both past and contemporary, Chicana artists have continued to push the boundaries of traditional Mexican-American values. Chicana art utilizes many different mediums to express their views including murals, painting, photography, etc. to embody feminist themes.

The momentum created from the Chicano Movement spurred a cultural renaissance among Chicanas and Chicanos. Political art was created by poets, writers, playwrights, and artists and used to defend against their oppression as second-class citizens. During the 1970s, Chicana feminist artists differed from their Anglo-feminist counterparts in the way they collaborated. Chicana feminist artists often utilized artistic collaborations and collectives that included men, while Anglo-feminist artists generally utilized women-only participants. Through different art mediums both past and contemporary, Chicana artists have continued to push the boundaries of traditional Mexican-American values.

=== Chicana collectives ===
==== Mujeres Muralistas ====
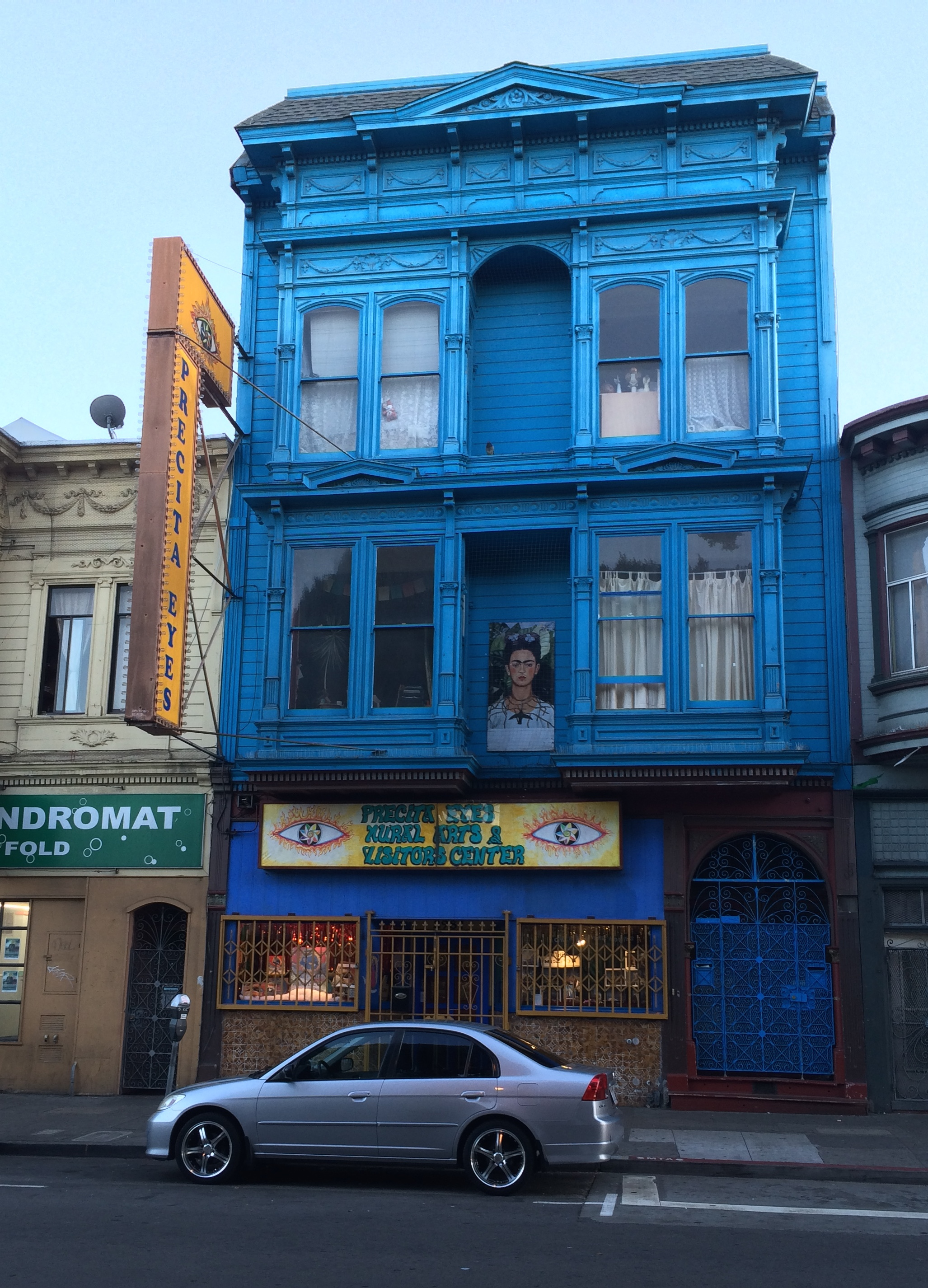
Precita Eyes (2015) formed out of inspiration from Mujeres Muralistas.

Mujeres Muralistas was a women's art collective in the Mission District of San Francisco. Members included Patricia Rodriguez, Graciela Carrillo, Consuelo Mendez, Irene Perez, Susan Cervantes, Ester Hernandez, and Miriam Olivo.

==== Las Chicanas ====
Las Chicanas' members were women only and included artists Judy Baca, Judithe Hernández, Olga Muñiz, and Josefina Quesada. In 1976, the group exhibited Venas de la Mujer in the Woman's Building.

==== Los Four ====
Muralist Judithe Hernández joined the all-male art collective in 1974 as its fifth member. The group already included Frank Romero, Beto de la Rocha, Gilbert Luján, and Carlos Almaráz. The collective was active from the 1970s through the early 1980s.

==== Social Public Art Resource Center (SPARC) ====
In 1976, co-founders Judy Baca (the only Chicana), Christina Schlesinger, and Donna Deitch established SPARC. SPARC consisted of studio and workshop spaces for artists. SPARC functioned as an art gallery and also kept records of murals. Today, SPARC is still active and similar to the past, encouraging space for Chicana/o community collaboration in cultural and artistic campaigns.

==== The Woman's Building (1973–1991) ====
The Woman's Building opened in Los Angeles, CA in 1973. In addition to housing women-owned businesses, the center held multiple art galleries and studio spaces. Women of color, including Chicanas, historically experienced racism and discrimination within the building from white feminists. Not many Chicana artists were allowed to participate in the Woman's Building's exhibitions or shows. Chicana artists Olivia Sanchez Brown and Rosalyn Mesquite were among the few included. Additionally, the group Las Chicanas exhibited Venas de la Mujer in 1976.

=== Murals ===
Murals were the preferred medium of street art used by Chicana artists during the Chicano Movement. Judy Baca led the first large-scale-project for SPARC, The Great Wall of Los Angeles. It took five summers to complete the 700-meter-long mural. The mural was completed by Baca, Judithe Hernández, Olga Muñiz, Isabel Castro, Yreina Cervántez, and Patssi Valdez in addition to over 400 more artists and community youth. Located in Tujunga Flood Control Channel in the Valley Glen area of the San Fernando Valley, the mural depicts California's erased history of marginalized people of color and minorities. In 1989, Yreina Cervántez along with assistants Claudia Escobedes, Erick Montenegro, Vladimir Morales, and Sonia Ramos began the mural, La Ofrenda, located in downtown Los Angeles. The mural, a tribute to Latina/o farm workers, features Dolores Huerta at the center with two women on either side to represent women's contributions to the United Farm Workers Movement. In addition to eight other murals, La Ofrenda was deemed historically significant by the Department of Cultural Affairs. In 2016, the restoration on La Ofrenda began after graffiti and another mural were painted over it.

An exhibition curated by LA Plaza de Cultura y Artes and the California Historical Society featuring previously mistreated or censored murals chose Barbara Carrasco's L.A. History: A Mexican Perspective in addition to others. Beginning in 1981 and taking about eight months to finish, the mural consisted of 43 eight-foot panels which tell the history of Los Angeles up to 1981. Carrasco researched the history of Los Angeles and met with historians as she originally planned out the mural. The mural was halted after City Hall objected to depictions of formerly enslaved entrepreneur and philanthropist Biddy Mason, the internment of Japanese American citizens during World War II, and the 1943 Zoot Suit Riots, among others, and Carrasco refused to remove them.

=== Film ===
The short film Chicana, produced in 1979 by Sylvia Morales, was archived in National Film Registry by the Library of Congress in 2021. The film was noted for its artistic approach to documentary, incorporating a "collage of artworks, stills, documentary footage, narration, and testimonies" through a Chicana feminist lens.

Linda García Merchant is an Afro-Chicana filmmaker who created several films, including Las Mujeres de la Caucus Chicana, Palabras Dulces, Palabras Amargas, and the autobiographical short No Es Facil.

=== Performance art ===
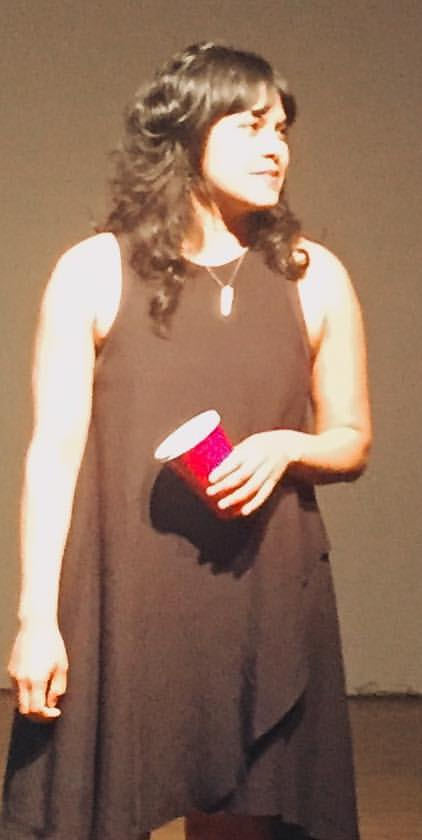
Xandra Ibarra is a prominent Chicana performance artist.

Performance art was not as popularly utilized among Chicana artists but it still had its supporters. Patssi Valdez was a member of the performance group Asco from the early 1970s to the mid-1980s. Asco's art spoke about the problems that arise from Chicanas/os unique experience residing at the intersection of racial, gender, and sexual oppression.

=== Photography ===
Laura Aguilar, is known for her "compassionate photography," which often involved using herself as the subject of her work but also individuals who lacked representation in the mainstream: Chicanas, the LBGTQ community, and women of different body types. During the 1990s, Aguilar photographed the patrons of an Eastside Los Angeles lesbian bar. Aguilar utilized her body in the desert as the subject of her photographs wherein she manipulated it to look sculpted from the landscape. In 1990, Aguilar created Three Eagles Flying, a three-panel photograph featuring herself half nude in the center panel with the flag of Mexico and the United States of opposite sides as her body is tied up by the rope and her face covered. The triptych represents the imprisonment she feels by the two cultures she belongs to.

=== Archivists ===
In 2015, Guadalupe Rosales began the Instagram account which would become Veterans and Rucas (@veterans_and_rucas). What started as a way for Rosales family to connect over their shared culture through posting images of Chicana/o history and nostalgia soon grew to an archive dedicated to not only '90 Chicana/o youth culture but also as far back as the 1940s. Additionally, Rosales has created art installations to display the archive away from its original digital format and exhibited solo shows Echoes of a Collective Memory and Legends Never Die, A Collective Memory.

The idea of sharing the erased history of Chicanas/os has been popular among Chicana artists beginning in the 1970s until present day. Judy Baca and Judithe Hernández have both utilized the theme or correcting history in reference to their mural works. In contemporary art, Guadalupe Rosales uses the theme of collective memory to share Chicana/o history and nostalgia.

=== La Virgen ===
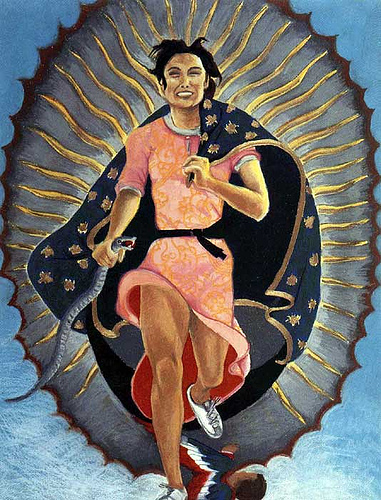
Yolanda Lopez's 1978 rendition of La Virgen de Guadalupe, titled 'Portrait of the Artist as the Virgen of Guadalupe.'

Yolanda López and Ester Hernandez are two Chicana feminist artists who used reinterpretations of La Virgen de Guadalupe to empower Chicanas. La Virgen is a symbol of the challenges Chicanas face as a result of the unique oppression they experience religiously, culturally, and through their gender.

- Ester Hernández references the sacred Virgen de Guadalupe in her painting, La Ofrenda (1988). Painting recognizes lesbian love and challenges the traditional role of la familia. It defied the reverence and holiness of La Virgen by being depicted as a tattoo on a lesbian's back. La Virgen de Guadalupe Defendiendo los Derechos de Los Xicanos (1975)
- Alma Lopez – Our Lady of Controversy "Irreverent Apparition" (2001). This image is mixed media and is a sacrilegious depiction of La Virgen.

== Chicana literature ==
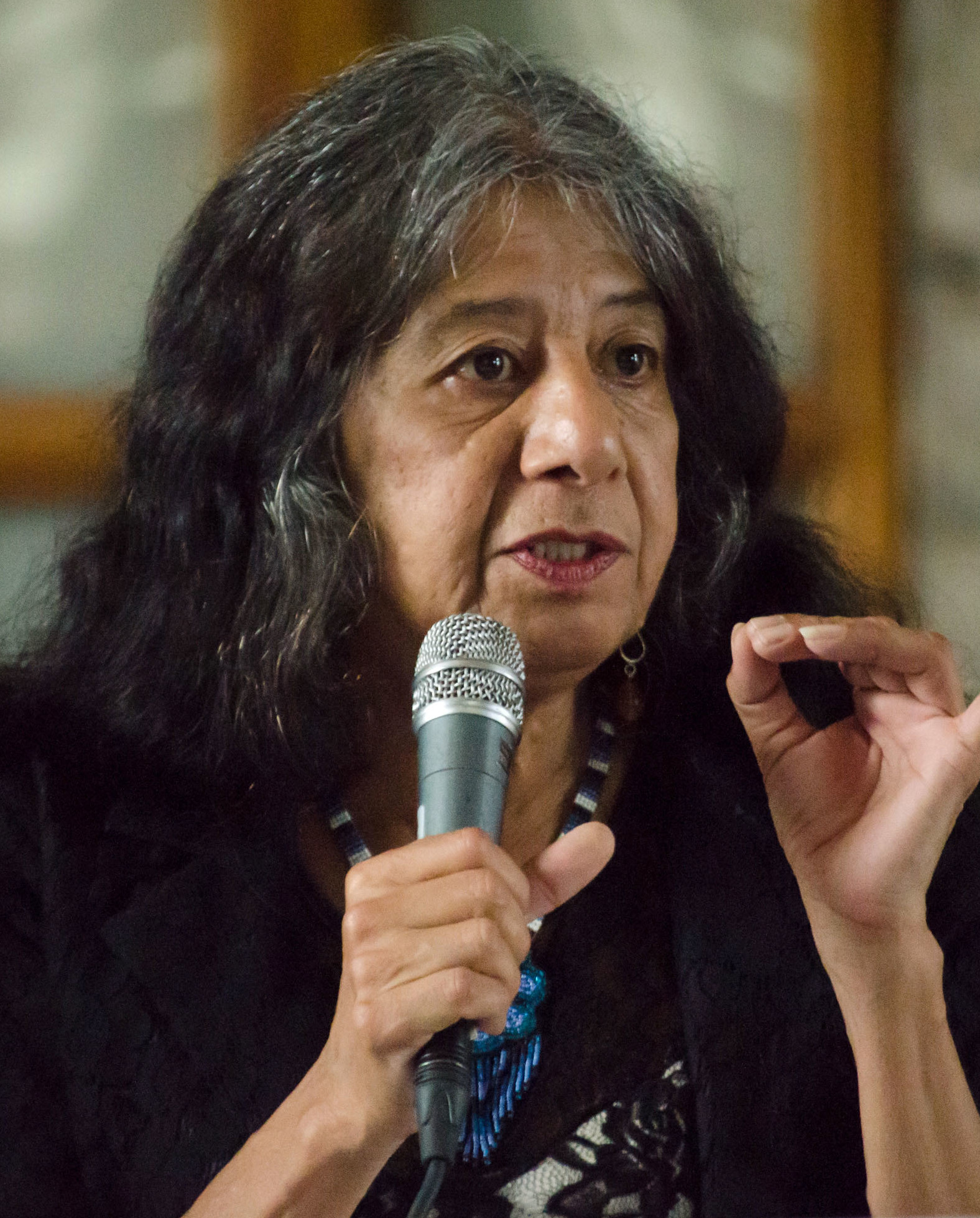
Lorna Dee Cervantes (2017) is one of the most influential Chicana feminist poets.

Since the 1970s, many Chicana writers (such as Cherríe Moraga, Gloria Anzaldúa and Ana Castillo) have expressed their own definitions of Chicana feminism through their books. Moraga and Anzaldúa edited an anthology of writing by women of color titled This Bridge Called My Back (published by Kitchen Table: Women of Color Press) in the early 1980s. Cherríe Moraga, along with Ana Castillo and Norma Alarcón, adapted this anthology into a Spanish-language text titled Esta Puente, Mi Espalda: Voces de Mujeres Tercermundistas en los Estados Unidos. Anzaldúa also published the bilingual (Spanish/English) anthology, Borderlands/La Frontera: The New Mestiza. Mariana Romo-Carmona, Alma Gómez, and Cherríe Moraga published a collection of stories titled Cuentos: Stories by Latinas, also published by Kitchen Table: Women of Color Press. The Spanish language has been referred to as a vital component to the preservation of Chicana culture.

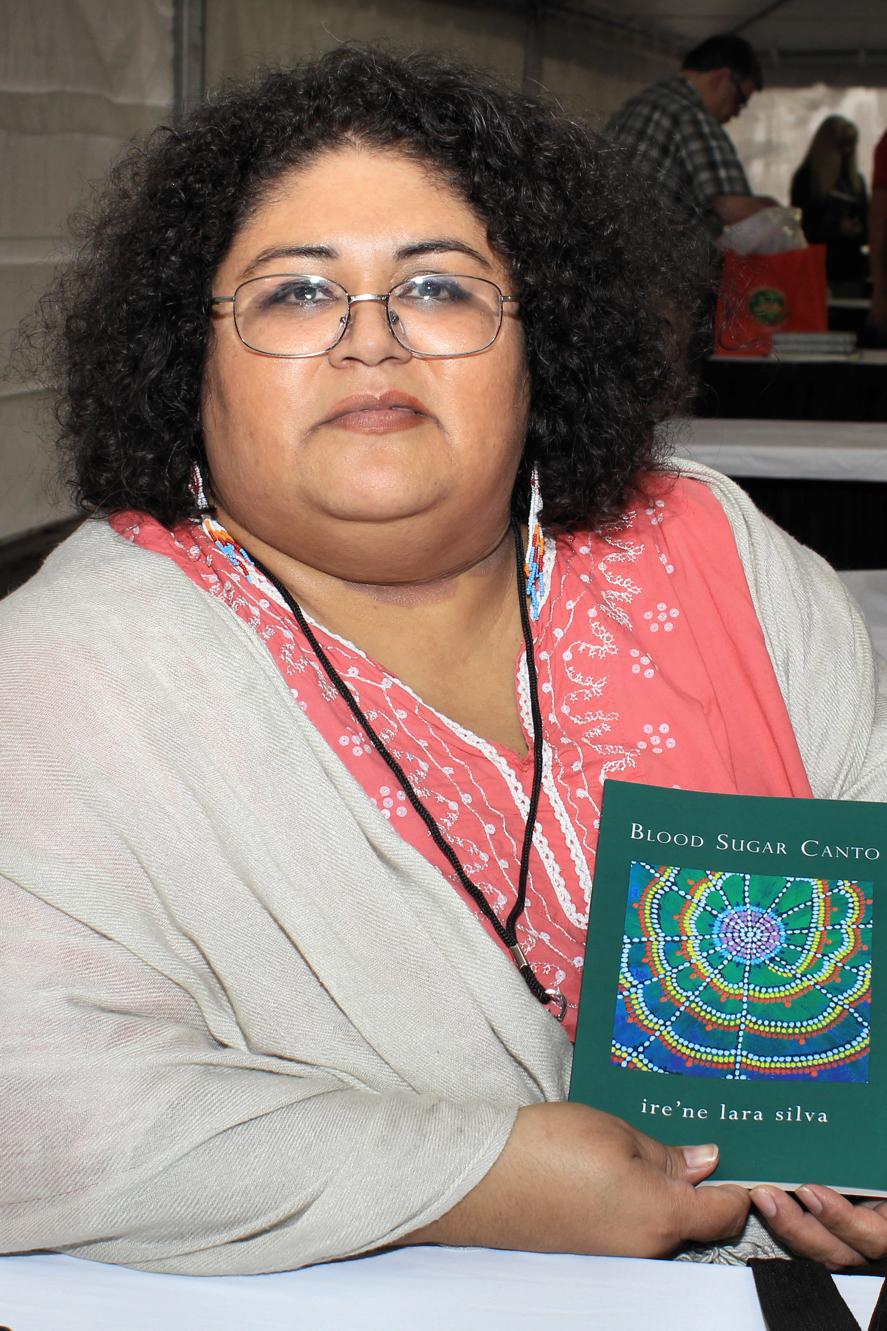
Chicana feminist poet ire'ne lara silva (2016)

The first Chicana feminist journal, the Encuentro Femenil, was published by Anna Nieto-Gómez in 1973. One of the first Chicana lesbian novels was Sheila Ortiz Taylor's Faultline, published in 1982.

Juanita Ramos and the Latina Lesbian History Project compiled an anthology including tatiana de la tierra's first published poem, "De ambiente", and many oral histories of Latina lesbians called Compañeras: Latina Lesbians (1987).

Anzaldúa points out that labeling a writer's identity characteristics allows readers to understand the writer's perspective, but also has the potential to marginalize those writers.

Since the 1990s, there has been a rise in Chicana literature embracing transnational feminism and transcultural themes, particularly bridging Chicana experiences with the Latin American context. For instance, this is demonstrated in Graciela Limón's works In Search of Bernabe (1997) and Erased Faces (2001).

== Chicana music ==
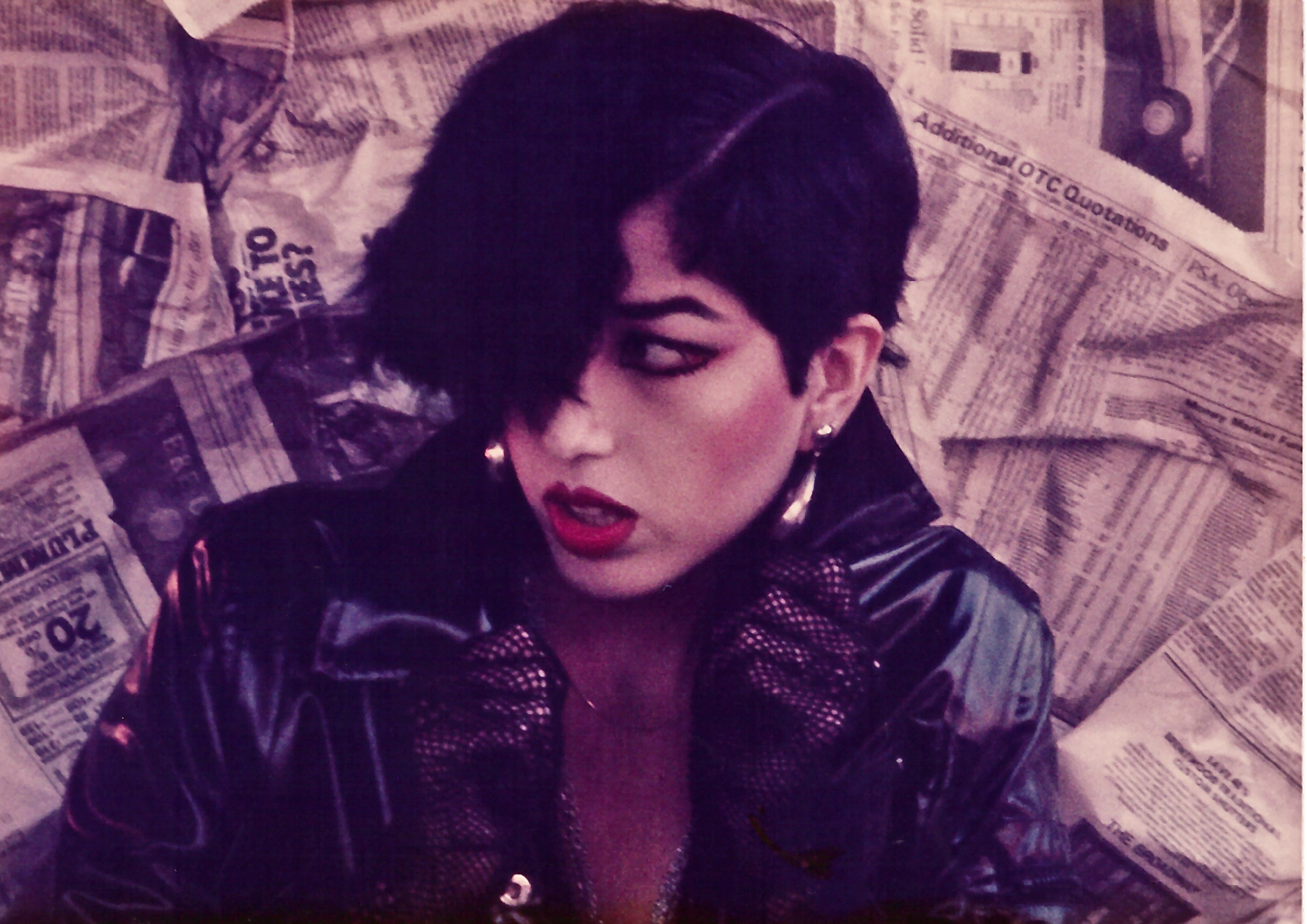
Alice Bag, Chicana punk artist (1980s)

Continually left absent from Chicano music history, many Chicana musical artists, such as Rita Vidaurri and María de Luz Flores Aceves, more commonly known as Lucha Reyes, from the 1940s and 50s, can be credited with many of strides that Chicana feminist movements have made in the past century. For example, Vidaurri and Aceves were among the first Mexicana women to wear charro pants while performing rancheras.

By challenging their own conflicting backgrounds and ideologies, Chicana musicians have continually broken the gender norms of their culture, and therefore created a space for conversation and change in the Latino communities.

There are many important figures in Chicana music history, each one giving a new social identity to Chicanas through their music. An important example of a Chicana musician was Rosita Fernández, a Tejano artist from San Antonio, Texas. So popular in the mid 20th century that she was called "San Antonio's First Lady of Song" by Lady Bird Johnson, Fernández is still a symbol of Chicana feminism for many Mexican Americans today. She was described as "larger than life", often performing in china poblana dresses, throughout her 60-year career. However, she never received a great deal of fame outside of the San Antonio, despite her long reign as one of the most active Mexican American woman public performers of the 20th century.

Other Chicana musicians and musical groups:

- Chelo Silva – Tejana Singer
- Eva Ybarra – Tejana Accordionist
- Ventura Alonzo – Chicana Accordionist
- Eva Garza – Tejana Singer
- Selena Quintanilla-Pérez – Tejana Singer
- Gloria Ríos – Hispanic Singer
- Girl in a Coma – Tejana indie rock band from San Antonio
- Quetzal – East Los Angeles Chicano alternative rock band
- Bags – Los Angeles punk rock band, led by Alice Bag

== Notable people ==
- Alma M. Garcia - Professor of Sociology at Santa Clara University
- Ana Castillo - Writer, novelist, poet, editor, essayist and playwright who is recognized for depicting the true realities of the Chicana feminist experience.
- Anna Nieto-Gómez – Key organizer of the Chicana Movement and founder of Hijas de Cuauhtémoc.
- Carla Trujillo - Writer, editor, and lecturer.
- Chela Sandoval – Associate Professor in the Chicano and Chicana Studies Department at University of California, Santa Barbara.
- Cherríe Moraga – Essayist, poet, activist educator, and artist in residence at Stanford University.
- Adriana Yadira Gallego - Painter, public artist, art administrator, for example at the Arts Foundation for Tucson and Southern Arizona.
- Dolores Huerta - Launched the National Farm Workers Association with César Chavez in 1962.
- Ester Hernandez - Chicana artist.
- Gloria Anzaldúa – Scholar of Chicana cultural theory and author of Borderlands/La Frontera: The New Mestiza, among other influential Chicana literature.
- Judithe Hernandez - Los Angeles based muralist who painted murals that promoted the Chicana movement.
- Martha Gonzalez (musician) - Chicana artivist and co-leader of Grammy Award-winning Quetzal (band).
- Martha P. Cotera – Activist and writer during the Chicana Feminist Movement and the Chicano Civil Rights Movement.
- Norma Alarcón – Influential Chicana feminist author.
- Sandra Cisneros – Key contributor to Chicana literature.
- Vicki L. Ruiz - American historian with a focus on Mexican-American women in the twentieth century.
- Elizabeth Martinez- Longtime social justice activist and author.
- Francisca Flores - Early Chicana activist who cofounded the Comisión Femenil Mexicana Nacional.

== Notable organizations ==
- Alianza Hispano-Americana - Founded in 1894, the Alianza members promoted civic virtues and acculturation, provided social activities and health benefits and insurance for its members.
- Chicas Rockeras South East Los Angeles– Promotes healing, growth, and confidence for girls through music education.
- California Latinas for Reproductive Justice – Promotes social justice and human rights of Latina women and girls through a reproductive justice framework.
- Las Fotos Project – Empowers Latina youth, helping young girls to build self-esteem and confidence through photography and self-expression.
- Museum of Latin American Art (MOLAA) – Located in Long Beach, CA, this museum expands knowledge and appreciation of modern and contemporary Latin American art.
- National Association for the Advancement of Colored People (NAACP) - Civil rights organization in the United States, formed in 1909 by W. E. B. Du Bois, Mary White Ovington, Moorfield Storey and Ida B. Wells in order to advance justice for African Americans.
- National Chicano Youth Liberation Conference - Organized by the Crusade for Justice, the event came from El Plan Espiritual de Aztlan, which sought to organize the Chicano people around a nationalist program.
- Ovarian Psycos - Young feminists of color in East Los Angeles who empower women through their bicycle brigades and rides.
- Radical Monarchs - California-based group in which girls of color earn social justice badges and focus on creating change in their communities earn social justice badges.

== See also ==
- Black feminism
- Chicano studies
- Latina lesbian organizations in the United States
- Feminism in Mexico
- Gender inequality in Mexico
- Gypsy feminism
- Intersectionality
- Third-world feminism
- White feminism
- Womanism
