= Anna Nieto-Gómez =

American journalist

Anna NietoGomez
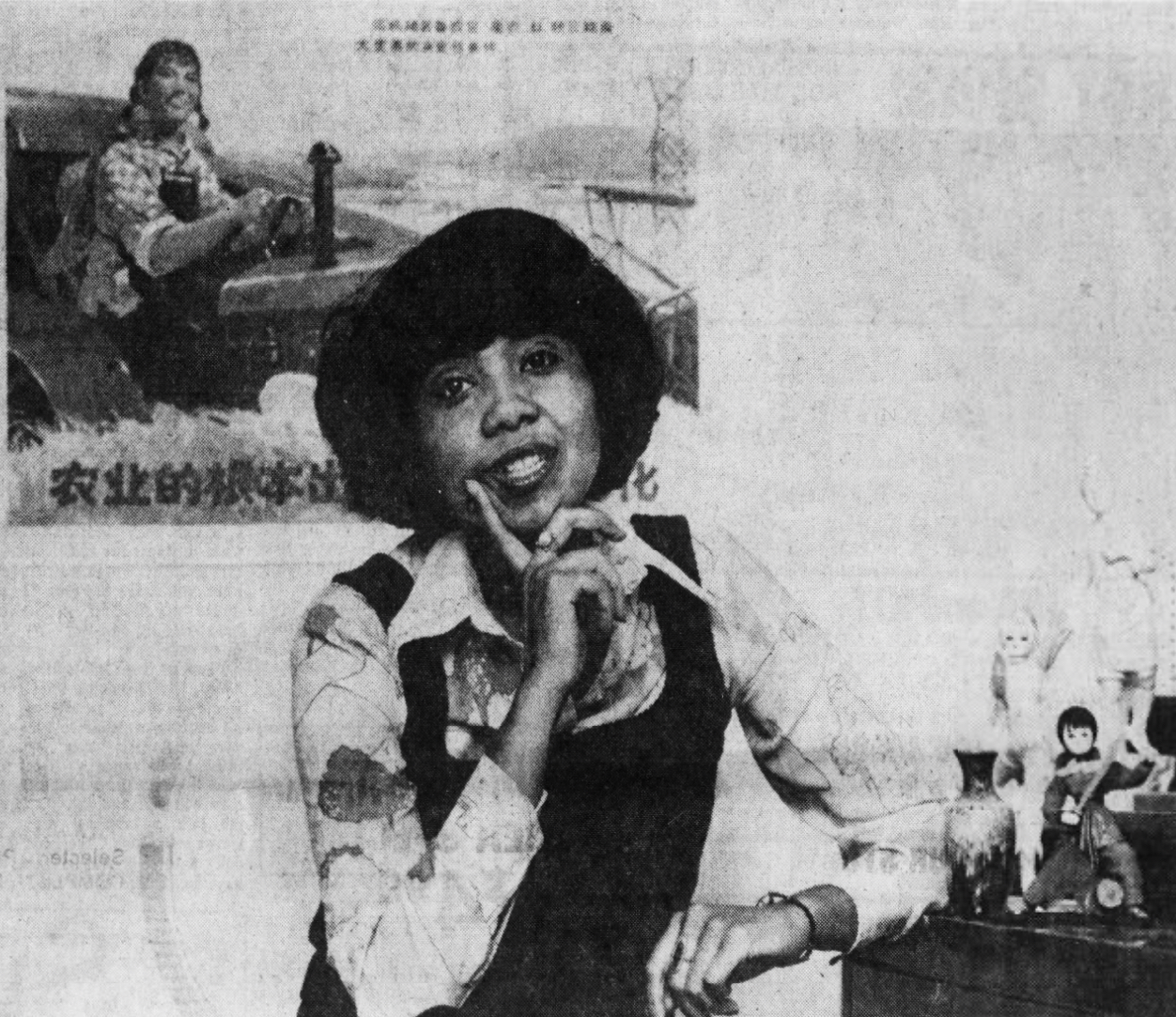
- NietoGomez in June 1977
- Born: 1946 (age 79–80); San Bernardino County, California, United States
- Movement: Chicana feminism

Anna Nieto-Gomez (also rendered as NietoGomez) is an American scholar, journalist, and author who was a central part of the early Chicana movement. She founded the feminist journal, Encuentro Femenil, in which she and other Chicana writers addressed issues affecting the Latina community, such as childcare, reproductive rights, and the feminization of poverty.

== Early life ==
Anna NietoGomez was born in San Bernardino, California on March 30, 1946, the eldest of three. NietoGomez is a third-generation Chicana on the maternal side of her family while having roots in New Mexico back to the 1600s on her father's side of the family. Her mother, a high school graduate, began working for the Santa Fe Railroad at the age of eighteen in 1944. NietoGomez learned the value of independence from her father, a man who grew up witnessing his single mother struggle to raise him. Her father, a World War II veteran, taught NietoGomez how to cook and sew since he believed a woman should be able to survive on their own.

From an early age, NietoGomez was very aware of the discrimination, both from racism and sexism, that existed in her segregated community. Much of this early awareness stemmed from her own family. For example, as a young girl NietoGomez disliked how her grandfather treated her grandmother; she went on a meal strike in order to negotiate a behavior change from him. According to NietoGomez, "my grandma would not eat at that table until everyone was finished-like a servant, like she wasn't family-so that didn't seem right since neither my father nor my other grandfather treated their wives this way." Another example is when her father was looking for a job. As NietoGomez recounts it, her father would be the first in line for an interview and always the last one to be called. NietoGomez thinks they did this to "put him in his place" because "That’s what San Bernardino was all about, putting Mexicans in their place."

NietoGomez was deeply involved in Catholic religious life, which later impacts her activism and political awareness; she attended Sunday mass, church services and the youth activities provided by her church. Her father was deeply against the church due to his experience as a young boy witnessing priests deny people their last rite because they were Mexican.

NietoGomez not only learned about racism from her family's experience but she also experienced it herself. In Arrowview Junior High NietoGomez suffered racial segregation and anti-Mexican discrimination, one instance that she described was during her lunch periods white students would not let her or other Mexican students sit at a certain cafeteria table because there was one designated table for Mexicans. "the kids told us that we couldn’t eat in the cafeteria and that the Mexicans had to eat at one table. They said, “You see that table? That’s where you guys eat. You can’t eat at any other table.” There was also discrimination from the teachers in which NietoGomez stated that "the teachers didn’t like us having us in there, and they let us know". They had a tracking system for students starting from A ending with C which disproportionally placed Mexican students in the lower academic track. Students that were classified as C had a "teacher who would tell them every day that they were dumb and stupid, dumb and stupid". NietoGomez quickly learned that the bullying happening was a form of "social control" because Mexican students were not the only ones being bullies, so was poor white students.

NietoGomez described resistance to segregation and breaking barriers when other white students started sitting at her table and would defend her and other Mexican students when people were questioning white students "What are you doing eating with those Mexicans?”

NietoGomez never wanted to not be Mexican despite all the discrimination she faced. Rather than internalizing the anti-mexican racism she experienced, she thought that those people were "raised badly", to her it was a matter of respect and education and how people treated her is not a reflection of her, rather on the upbringing of others.

NietoGomez had dyslexia which caused her to read slowly affecting her studies and she also suffered from narcolepsy greatly affecting her education. NietoGomez originally wanted to learn history but due to the course load and her medical problems she had to make do with sociology. In eighth grade, she participated in an Aztec dance program through the Mexican consulate in San Barnadino which introduced her to Mexican history. She quickly became the leader of her group because she was the only one that could understand Spanish however she could not speak it well. Due to not being able to speak it well, she suffered humiliation from Spanish speakers. In one incident, she was accused of being a "Chicana falsa" by her Mexican Spanish teacher in school, this incident was reported to the principal by her mother and the teacher further humiliated her by claiming "She’s ashamed to be Mexican, and she reported me to the principal.” in front of the class. She was then switched into another Spanish class in which she learned vocabulary but did not speak Spanish because the teacher was Italian. It was not until she became an EOP (Education Opportunity Program) counselor that she was finally able to practice speaking in Spanish without judgement.

== College years ==
In 1967, NietoGomez began attending California State University at Long Beach and became involved in the Mexican-American students rights movement, founding Hijas de Cuauhtémoc in 1971, a feminist-centered Chicana newspaper. NietoGomez and the women's group, also named Hijas de Cuauhtémoc, "took their name from a Mexican feminist organization that worked against the Porfirio Díaz dictatorship in Mexico," and also addressed issues ignored by the Chicano population, including those to do with gender and sexuality. Her contemporaries in the group included Adelaida Del Castillo, Sylvia Castillo, Leticia Hernandez, and Corinne Sanchez. After NietoGomez's father died she wanted a change and she was a sign written on it saying "Chicano" which was her first time seeing that word in writing.This prompted her in learning that there was a Chicano Organization being started.

NietoGomez became politically aware when she joined UMAS (United Mexican American Students later merging under the umbrella name MECHA). Through UMAS she helped with their mission of recruiting more Mexican American students into higher education. During her time in UMAS, she faced problems such as treatment of fellow students, she felt that people only respected others based on social position. For example, she didn't know who Cesar Chavez was and member made her feel inferior by calling her a "Dumb Mexican" and through this interaction she felt that ”..on one end, were trying to dispel these myths and these attitudes that were reinforcing this projecting inferiority and also superiority of one group over another, but then we were just reflecting back the same kind of attitude"

In the same year that she joined UMAS, she also joined Teatro at Long Beach and learned to sing Mexican revolution songs which was a part of political awareness that she was learning in college.

During NietoGomez involvement in UMAS she became critical of inequality, especially after an incident in which one of her female colleagues had to resign from being president because she believed that "Women’s role is behind the scenes to make sure that things keep going. That’s our role. But the men, they need to be recognized, too, poor pobrecitos. They suffer such oppression and that they need to have that opportunity." NietoGomez did not agree with her. During this time, NietoGomez would later organize Chicanas de Aztlan in response to the sexual harassment and sexist behavior chicanas would experience when joining the organization. NietoGomez states that when chicanas were recruited men "would harass the women and thought it was okay. That was their initiation. Every Chicana that would come into the trailer, especially if she was good-looking, had boobs... look at her boobs" . According to NietoGomez, they would also "talk to you like you were a prostitute. That’s what they did. They did that with every woman that walked into the trailer."

She alongside her colleagues started Semana de La Raza at Cal State Long Beach and it was in the first meeting that she had her first public speaking event because the original speaker did not show up. Her original role was to pass flyers and get names to recruit people.

During this time NietoGomez was also involved in el Movimiento Estudiantil Chicano de Aztlán,(MEChA). Much of NietoGomez’s activism was met with resistance from male Chicano activists who felt Chicana feminist groups were either trivial or harmful to the broader movement. Though she was elected to president of the student organization, she was hung in effigy by male students who felt a woman should not represent their organization. Male Chicano activists also commonly tried to delegitimize Chicana feminists by comparing them to white American feminists. Nieto-Gomez called those comparisons “divisive and threatening to the strength of the movement.”

== Career ==
Later NietoGomez would serve at California State University, Northridge, in the Department of Chicano Studies, where she challenged sexism directly through the Chicano studies classes she taught. While at Cal-State Northridge, NietoGomez created the curriculum for critical Chicana studies courses on the topics of family, global identity, history, and contemporary issues. In the Spring of 1973, Hijas de Cuauhtémoc developed into Encuentro Femenil, considered the first Chicana scholarly journal. Encuentro Femenil published poetry and articles based on issues affecting the Chicana community, though publication stopped within two years. Her publication record also included 16 articles, many now classic works on Chicana feminism.

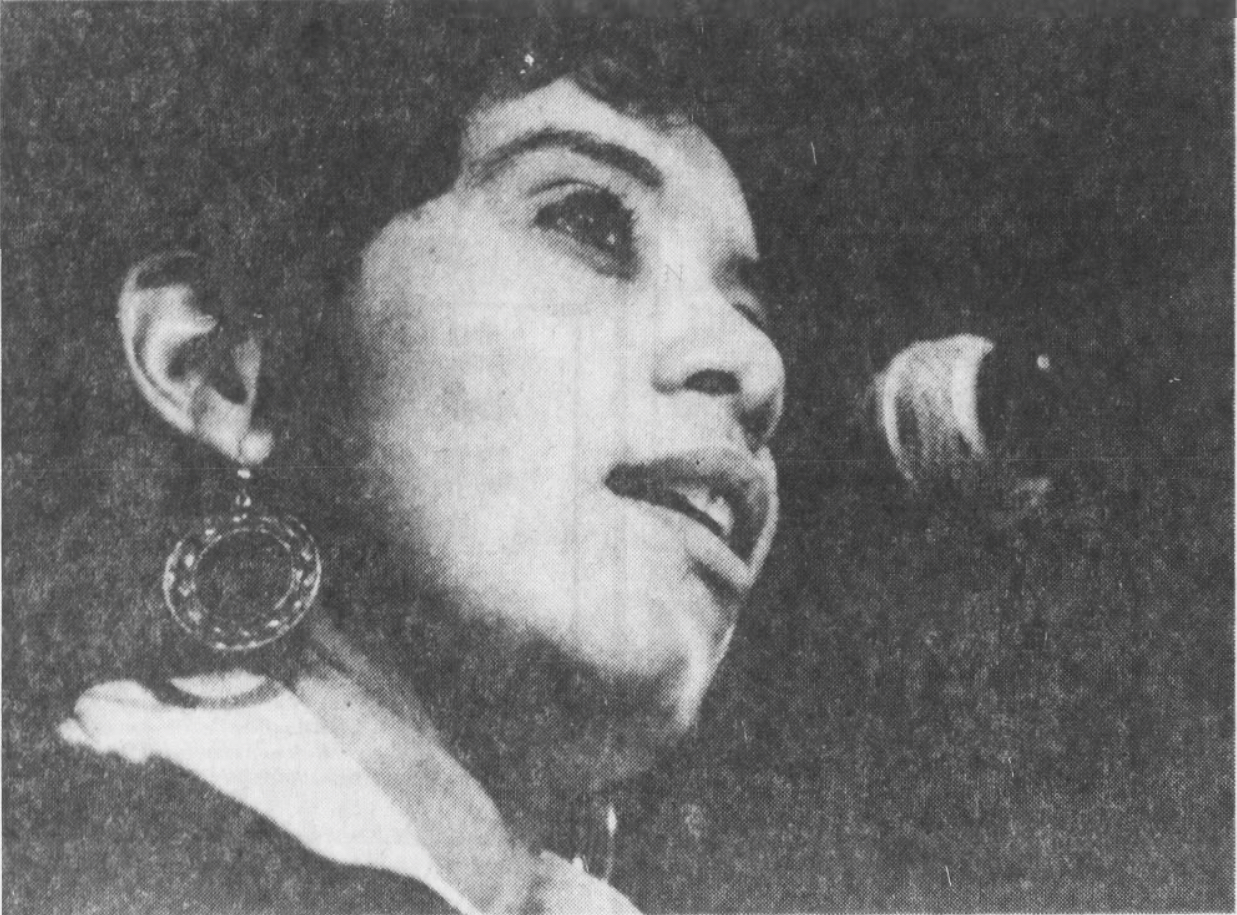
NietoGomez performing "Images of the Chicana" at The Barn, UCR in April 1979

NietoGomez was denied tenure at California State University, Northridge in 1976, due to what she considered her political stance. After a lengthy battle to appeal the tenure decision, NietoGomez resigned on September 3, 1976. NietoGomez's tenure battle and professorship in general demonstrate not only the power dynamics and pitfalls in white male-dominated institutions, but also within the Chicano movement of the time. NietoGomez has published journals such as La Feminista and Encuentro Femenil and continues to publish and research into areas of sexuality, reproductive rights and higher education.

== Selected works ==
- Encuentro Femenil
- The Needs of the Chicano on the College Campus (1969)
