= A Mi San Antonio =

Studio album by Eva Ybarra
- Released: 1994
- Genre: Tejano
- Label: Rounder
- Producer: Cathy Ragland

Eva Ybarra chronology
A Mi San Antonio (1994)	Romance Inolvidable (1996)

A Mi San Antonio is the debut album by the American musician Eva Ybarra, released in 1994. She is credited with her band, Su Conjunto. While incorporating many musical styles, the album is primarily in the Tejano conjunto idiom.

== Production ==
The album, containing rancheras, huapangos, and polkas, was produced by Cathy Ragland, an ethnomusicologist. Ragland also provided the liner notes, which included English translations of the songs. Five of the songs were written by Ybarra; the other seven by Guadalupe Betancourt, Lily Ybarra Gonzales, and Gloria Garcia. The title track and "El Gallito Madrugador" are instrumentals.

== Critical reception ==
Professional ratings
Review scores
Source	Rating
AllMusic	3/5 stars
Chicago Tribune	2/4 stars
Robert Christgau	(neither)
MusicHound World: The Essential Album Guide	4/5 stars

The Austin American-Statesman wrote that "Ybarra interprets a number of Mexican cumbias, rancheras and polka, all supplemented by her accordion's many emotional shadings." The Chicago Tribune noted that the songs are "mostly jaunty, polka-like numbers that encourage dancing and carousing, good-time music even when the lyrics sometimes reflect a less than perfect existence." Texas Monthly deemed the album "a superb if largely conventional conjunto set."

AllMusic wrote: "The lyrical content is essentially based in old styles of Mexican poetry, which works well for the format. Instrumentally, the real innovations are in small changes in chord progressions and tempos from where one would generally expect the musician to travel."

== Track listing ==
No.	Title	Length
1.	"Cariño Bueno"
2.	"Lloro por Tí"
3.	"El Gallito Madrugador"
4.	"Triste Adio"
5.	"Un Corazoncito"
6.	"A Mi San Antonio"
7.	"Negra Africans"
8.	"Nos Digamos Adios"
9.	"Preferible Morir"
10.	"Serenata a Media"
11.	"En Esta Cantina"
12.	"A Bailar con Eva"
