= Hijas de Cuauhtémoc =

Chicana feminist newspaper

- School: State University Long Beach
- Founder(s): Anna NietoGomez, Cindy Honesto, Marta López, Corinne Sánchez Adelaida R. Del Castillo, Sylvia Castillo
- Language: English, Spanish
- Headquarters: Long Beach, California
- City: Long Beach, California
- Country: United States

Hijas de Cuauhtémoc (Spanish for "Daughters of Cuauhtémoc") was a student Chicana feminist newspaper founded in 1971 by Anna Nieto-Gómez and Adelaida Castillo while both were students at California State University, Long Beach.

== The Chicana movement ==
Between 1970 and 1980, the Chicana feminist movement developed in the United States to address the particular issues that concern Chicanas as women of color. This movement developed out of the Chicano student's movement. The Chicano movement centered on a wide range of matters: social justice, equality, educational reforms, and political and economic self-determination for Chicano communities in the United States. In the same way that Chicano males were questioning the historical and contemporary realities of Chicanos in the US, Chicanas established to investigate the oppressions forming their own experiences as women of color. Chicana/o studies professor Maylei Blackwel has written that the student's newspaper Hijas de Cuauhtémoc was a vital part of the uprising Chicana movement.

== Founding ==
Anna Nieto-Gómez, co-founder of the Hijas de Cuauhtemoc newspaper, found her inspiration from a book written by Fredrick Turner that highlighted a Mexican Revolutionary group named the same. She said that "We were motivated to start Hijas because chicana contemporaries were experiencing sexual harassment within chicano movement. [...] Male leadership seeking freedom and civil rights for himself and not for the included chicanas." Anna Nieto-Gómez was exposed discrimination at a very early age, and from those experiences, she wanted to fight for the right against discrimination and sexism. She felt that the Feminist movement was a part of their Chicana history. While working as a counselor and instructor at California State University Long Beach, she mentored and organized Chicana undergraduates. As an outcome of that organization process, they published Hijas de Cuauhtémoc. Besides Anna NietoGomez, Cindy Honesto, Marta López, Corinne Sánchez, Adelaida R. Del Castillo and Sylvia Castillo are the founders and chief editors of Hijas de Cuauhtémoc. Some women had experience before with writing for El Alacrán and other student and community newspapers. The group Hijas de Cuauhtémoc became a way for women in the Chicana/o movement to organize collectively. They were able to express their experience as young, working-class Chicanas and to address issues that were ignored in the student's movement like for example their critique about machismo in the Chicano movement. The student newspaper presented new forms of feminism as they started the dialogue about the intersection of class and race. These concepts were presented through an "innovative mixed-genre format that was equal parts journalism, poetry, photography, art, social critique, recovered women history, and political manifesto". It involved economic and social issues, political consciousness and Mexicana/Chicana history. Moreover, it provided space for many young activists to express their own political insights and visions".

=== Support ===
To print the first issue, the newspaper received financial support from a Norwalk Mutualista society, a tradition of Mexican migrant communities. In contrast to the support group, other Chicano men, especially Chicanos in the sphere of the Chicano newspaper El Alacrán were less supportive of the arising of a feminist Chicana newspaper.

=== Goal ===
The newspaper stated that its goal was to "inform Chicana about herself through history by reporting Chicanas political activities in the communities and by educating her to socioeconomic conditions that she must deal with as a woman in a minority culture of an oppressive society."

== Content ==
The issues covered subjects like sterilization and reproduction health, welfare and labor rights, employment and gender discrimination, access to health care, Chicana incarceration, family and cultural roles, along with sexism, sexual politics and women's role in the movement.

Overall the paper encouraged Chicanas to complete their education by providing them with a support group, an organizational tool, and a forum for addressing their concerns as women. Moreover," the newspaper was a vehicle for regional communication where Chicanas spread information about their political activities, campus issues, Mexican history, the growth of Chicana feminism, women in prison, role of women in the movement and a struggle against sexism and sexual politics". Besides working on the issues, members of Hijas de Cuauhtémoc participated in Community organizations and made links among other Chicana groups such as the La Raza Community Center in Eastside Long Beach, the UFW's grape boycott and Teatro Campesino.

=== First issue ===
The first issue was published in March 1971, dealing with the topic of Chicanas studying at California State University at Long Beach as well as Chicana history, Chicana education, Chicanas in the Prison, Chicana poetry and socio-sexual problems in Chicano organizations and families. One particular article from the first issue titled "La Mujer Todavia Impotente" written by Rosita Morales, was originally from Papel Chicano of Housten, Texas. It was one of the many articles from other Chicanas, that were not part of the newspaper, that the newspaper would feature. Anna Nieto Gomez thought that the importance of the paper was to organize in order to improve the status of the women within the large aspect of the movement.

Within the first issue Anna Nieto Gomez as well as Enriqueta Longeaux y Vasquez were given a platform to respond to the earlier conference where a leader of the Chicano Movement said that "Chicanas don't want to be liberated," the piece written by Nieto Gomez that responded to this comment was titled "Chicana's Identify."

Even though the issue did not have extensive content, the article on "Macho Attitudes" received most attention, which was mostly negative. The criticism received from MEChA was because they founded something that was separate from El Alacran, the newspaper for the Chicano movement the newspaper, it was still met fondly by the community. One of the activists said, "Chicanas can no longer remain in a subservient role…… in the Chicano movement." This was to be seen that if someone opposed women from being equal that there was no place for that person to be a leader within the Chicana Feminist movement.

=== Second issue ===
This issue made a shift in the status of the newspaper as it moved from being mostly a local newspaper to a more regional forum for Chicanas at the time. A month later, in April the second issues were intended to circulate thoughts and ideas produced at the Los Angeles Chicana Educational Conference. The conference was planned in preparation for the first national Chicana Conference, la Conferencia de Mujeres por la Raza, which was to be held in Houston later that year. They also used the newspaper to highlight important events, such as the University Regional Conference in Houston, Texas. Through the advertising, they were able to get 250 attendees to the conference.

=== Third issue ===
The third Issue came out in June 1971. It provided Information about Chicana Workshops at the May Educational Chicana Conference and contained information about the 5-point program of Hermanidad, the philosophy of Chicana sisterhood. In order to publish their last issue the founders pooled their earnings and held fundraisers as well as to make a trip to the conference.

== Ridicule and Resistance ==
The women of Hijas de Cuauhtemoc were not taken seriously throughout the course of their existence. Chicano movement activists both men and women ridiculed their work and viewed their writing as betraying the "familia". A mock burial for the writers of the newspaper with a MEChA "priest", where they had tombstones made names inscribed with the names of the creators of the publication, signifying the end of their lives by working on this newspaper. MEChA stands for Movimiento Estudiantil Chicano de Aztlan, a student organization at California State University-Long Beach. MEChA did this also to take a stand to Nieto-Gómez, signifying their defiance to her newly elected seat as president of the organization, since she was female. Whether or not an activist labeled themselves as a feminista they "experienced harassment, scorn and criticism, labeling them agringadas or malinches."

== Transformation ==
In spring 1973, original members of the Hijas de Cuauhtémoc staff formed a core founding group for Encuentro Femenil, including Anna Nieto-Gómez, Cindy Honesto, Marta López, Corinne Sánchez, and Adelaida R. Del Castillo. Hoping to expand the reach of Hijas de Cuauhtémoc, they founded the first Chicana journal centering Chicana scholarship and activism. They aimed to document community issues and struggles as well as rise greater political awareness of Chicana issues among a larger Chicana/o community. Additionally, the publication of Encuentro Femenil not only documented the political mobilization of Chicanas, but it encouraged new forms of Chicana political solidarity and participation.
