= Olivia Sanchez Brown =

American artist

Olivia Sanchez Brown is a multimedia Chicana artist and curator in the Los Angeles area and has been active since the early 1970s. With over 25 years of experience in the visual arts community, Sanchez-Brown is known for her colorful, fluid, and energetic works that explore themes of nature, the environment, and human connection. Her artwork spans landscape, seascapes, and mixed media pieces, creating scenarios that invite the viewer's imagination to explore the relationship between the human experience and the natural world.

== Early life and education ==
Olivia Sanchez-Brown's background and education in the arts remain relatively private. However, her creative practice is strongly influenced by her extensive travels and interactions with the natural environment, particularly water. This connection to the Earth's topography has been a key element in her work, where she seeks to capture aesthetic moments of awe and quiet, while questioning humanity's impact on the ecosystem.

== Career and contributions ==
Throughout her career, Sanchez-Brown has exhibited her work in numerous venues across the United States and Europe, including prominent institutions like LA Artcore, the Craft and Folk Art Museum, the Armory Center for the Arts, and Café Cultural. Her exhibitions often explore the intersection of art, culture, and the environment, and she has participated in group shows such as Mothers, Eggshells and the People Who Birth Us, a performance and installation exhibition curated by Kim Abeles.

Sanchez-Brown has also been involved in curating and organizing art exhibitions, including the Southern California Women’s Caucus for Art Juried Exhibition and Staring Intently at a Sound: The Studio Practice of Mac McClain. She has collaborated with various artists, writers, and performers on projects such as Requiem for a Blue Planet, Cycles, Circles, and Rituals, and Dark and Bright Fires, a dramatic reading featuring seven writers. She also participated in the Latina Artists and Writers Exchange, in collaboration with Linda Alvarez’ Grant from Poets and Writers, Los Angeles County Museum of Art, and Beyond Baroque Literary Arts Center.

== Personal life ==
Olivia Sanchez-Brown currently resides and works in Echo Park, Los Angeles, where she continues to explore new ways to express her artistic vision and deepen her engagement with the natural world through her art.

== Art ==
Olivia Sanchez Brown was one of the first Chicana Artists to be featured in a juried exhibition in The Woman's Building in 1973, around the time that The Woman's Building was first established. Sanchez-Brown has worked extensively with writers, curating exhibitions that highlight the work of other creative individuals. She has been a key figure in various art performances, installations, and exhibits, and was notably included in the "Madre Tierra" exhibit in collaboration with several Chicano artists.
