= Alma Garcia =

American short story writer (born 1970)

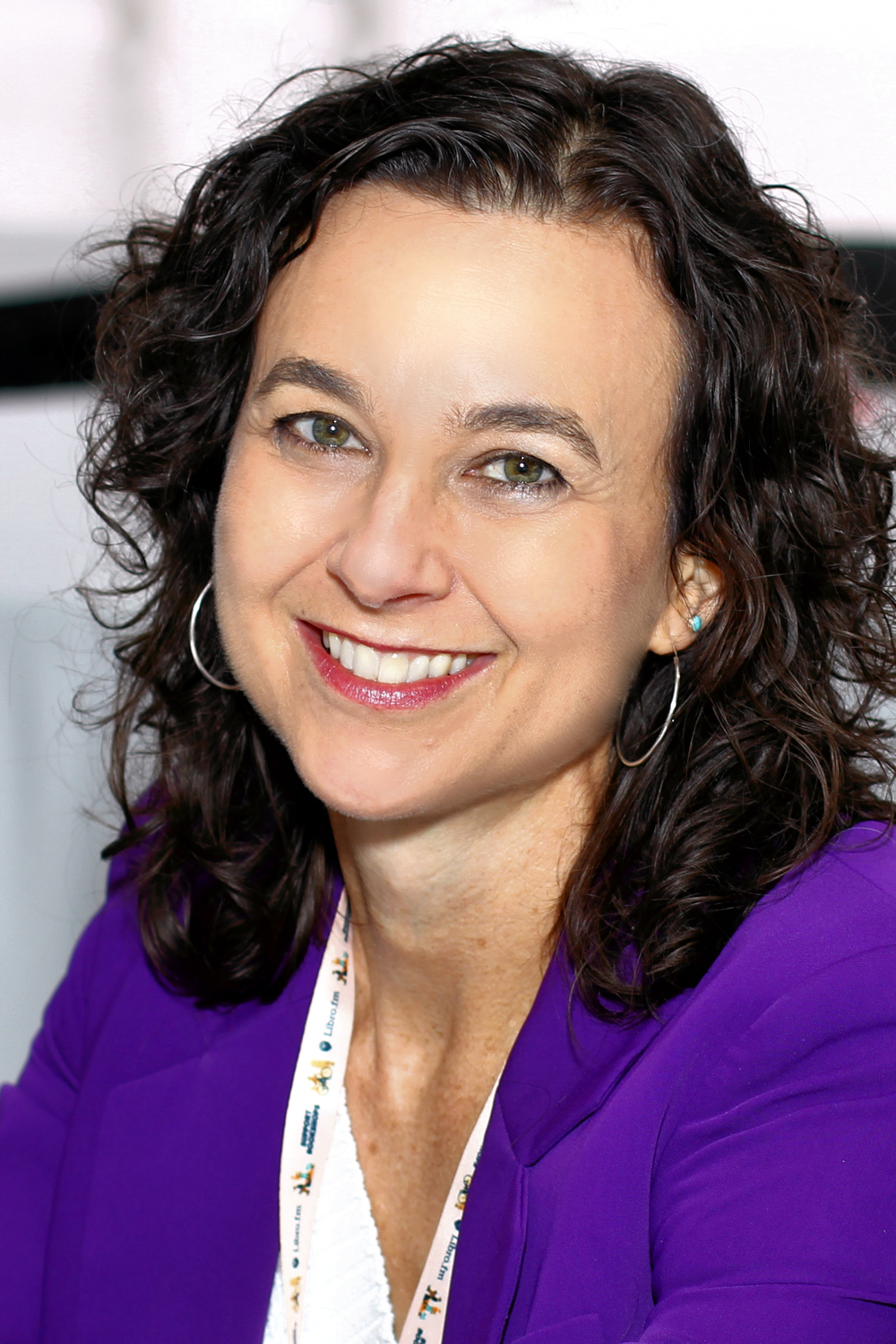
- Garcia at the 2023 Texas Book Festival
- Born: 1970 (age 54–55)
- Education: University of New Mexico (BA, 1993); University of Arizona (MFA, 1999)

Alma García (born 1970) is an American novelist and short story writer. University of Arizona Press published her debut novel, All That Rises, on October 17, 2023.

Alma García grew up in El Paso, Texas, and Albuquerque, New Mexico. She graduated from the University of New Mexico with a Bachelor of Arts in 1993, and from the University of Arizona with an Master of Fine Arts in 1999. She has worked as journalist and editor, construction worker, and bookseller, and is currently a fiction instructor, manuscript consultant, and artist coach based in Seattle, Washington.

Her short fiction has appeared as a part of the University of Washington's School of Art, Art History and Design's Data Epics project; in phoebe, Kweli Journal, Duende, Bluestem, Enizagam, Narrative Magazine, Passages North, and Boulevard, and also as a contributor in the anthologies, Puro Chicanx Literature of the 21st Century and Roadside Curiosities: Stories of American Pop Culture.

== Awards ==
- 2014 Enizagam Literary Award in Fiction finalist
- 2009 Jack Straw Writers Program fellow
- 2007 Narrative Prize
- 2007 Rona Jaffe Foundation Writers' Award
- 2005 Waasmode Fiction Prize finalist, Passages North
- 2004 Dana Award in Short Fiction
- 2000 Winner, Short Fiction Contest for Emerging Writers, Boulevard

== Works ==
- All That Rises, novel. Forthcoming Oct 17, 2023, Camino del Sol/University of Arizona Press.
- Hi! How Can I Help? Severance Ghost Riders The Who and the You The Data Epics project, Studio Tilt, School of Art + Art History + Design, University of Washington, 2021-2022
- “"Severance",” (from The Data Epics) phoebe. Winter 2022.
- "The Brown Invasion," novel excerpt from All That Rises. Puro Chicanx Literature of the 21st Century. Cutthroat: A Journal of the Arts in collaboration with the Black Earth Institute. Winter 2020.
- "Before He Rises,” Kweli Journal, December 2015.
- “Pearl,” Duende. Spring 2015.
- “Luck,” Bluestem. Spring 2015.
- “Harvest,” Enizagam. 2014.
- "The Great Beyond," Roadside Curiosities: Stories of American Pop Culture. August 2014, University of Leipzig/Picador.
- "Shallow Waters," (excerpt, audio recording), Narrative Magazine. Winter, 2010.
- "Letter to El Mateo". Narrative Magazine. Winter 2007.
- "Truly," Passages North. Winter/Spring 2005
- "The Great Beyond". Narrative Magazine. Winter 2005.
- "Neverland," Boulevard, Fall 2000.
