= Eva Ybarra =

American conjunto musician

Eva Ybarra (born March 2, 1945) known as the "Queen of the Accordion", is a professional conjunto musician.

== Early life ==
Ybarra was born on the west side of San Antonio, Texas, one of nine children. Her father was a truck driver. As a child, she played piano and accordion, later recounting: "I started by listening to the radio, and I learnt by ear, copying what I heard. But I didn't want to copy anyone, I wanted my own style." She performed locally and on the radio from a young age, and won her first record deal at age 14 with Rosina Records.

== Musical career ==
Ybarra writes original music as the leader of the band Eva Ybarra y Su Conjunto. She is known for using non-standard chord progressions in her compositions. She has said about her style: "I use a lot of inversions and scales. Pentatonic scales. Major 9th chords...I go to dances and can play traditional for people to dance, but I prefer concerts where I can play progressive music." She performs on the accordion as well as the bajo sexto, guitarrón, electric bass, and keyboards.

Her albums include A Mi San Antonio (1994), and Romance Inolvidable (Unforgettable Romance) (1996). They encompass several styles of music including rancheras, country songs, bolero tangos, huapangos, and ballads. Some of her well-known songs include "A mi San Antonio", "El gallito madrugador" (The Early Rising Rooster), "El perico loco" (The Crazy Parrot), and "A bailar con Eva" (Dance with Eva).

Ybarra began performing regularly in the Tejano Conjunto Festival, hosted by the Guadalupe Cultural Arts Center, in 1981. She has also taught music performance at the University of Washington and Palo Alto College, at the Guadalupe Cultural Arts Center in San Antonio, and for the Apprenticeship Program of Texas Folklife. She was featured in the touring exhibit "American Sabor: Latinos in U.S. Popular Music."

She continues to live and perform in San Antonio.

== Discography ==
=== Albums ===
- A Mi San Antonio (1994, Rounder CD 6056)
- Romance Inolvidable (1996, Rounder CD 6062)
- Space Needle (2004, Consonante International)
- Mi Gloria (2004, Evari)
- La Pura Alegria, with Gloria García Abadia (2004, Evari)

=== Singles ===
- "Entre Suspiro y Suspiro" / "Negro Destino" (1970s, Hacienda HAC-498)

=== Various artist compilation albums ===
| Album title | Record label | Catalog number | Release year | Song title(s) |
|---|---|---|---|---|
| Planet Squeezebox: Accordion Music from Around the World | Ellipsis Arts | 3470 | 1995 | "A Mi San Antonio" |
| A Taste of Tex Mex: 40 Tejano Tidbits | Emporio | DEMPCD 028 | 1997 | "Pobre Palomita" |
| The Rough Guide to Tex-Mex | World Music Network (UK) | RGNET 1037 CD | 1999 | "Quiereme, Quiereme" |
| Tex Mex Favourites, Vol. 2 | Weton-Wesgram (Netherlands) | KBOX3235 | 2000 | "Con Todo Mi Ser " |
| Tex Mex Favourites, Vol. 2 | Weton-Wesgram (Netherlands) | KBOX3235 | 2000 | "Pobre Palomita" |
| Accordion Dreams | Hacienda Records | HAC-7586 | 2001 | "Pobre Palomita" |
| Tejano Picante: Tex-Mex Classics | Rhino | R2 74365 | 2001 | "Dora" |
| Tex Mex | ARC Music (UK) | EUCD1787 | 2003 | "El Gallito Madrugador" |
| Tex Mex | ARC Music (UK) | EUCD1787 | 2003 | "La Ricachona" |
| Tex Mex Party | Weton-Wesgram (Netherlands) | EXCEL2140 | 2004 | "Pobre Palomita" |

== Awards and honors ==
- 2003: inducted into the Guadalupe Cultural Arts Center Conjunto Hall of Fame
- 2008: inducted into the Tejano R.O.O.T.S Hall of Fame
- 2008: inducted into the Univision Salon de Fama
- 2009: inducted into the Tejano Conjunto Music Hall of Fame and Museum
- 2015: received the South Texas Conjunto Association Lifetime Achievement Award
- 2017: received a National Heritage Fellowship awarded by the National Endowment for the Arts, which is the United States government's highest honor in the folk and traditional arts
- 2022: on May 18, 2021, the Texas Legislature in collaboration with the Texas Commission on the Arts designated Ybarra as the 2022 Texas State Musician
