= Josefina Quezada =

Mexican-Chicana muralist and photographer (1925–2012)

Josefina Quezada (circa 1925 - May 2012) was a Mexican-born Chicana muralist, photographer and supporter of the arts in Los Angeles. There are twelve murals in Los Angeles created by Quezada.

== Biography ==
Quezada was born in Mexico City. She grew up in the Mexicaltzingo neighborhood of Guadalajara. In the 1940s, she studied at the National Autonomous University of Mexico (UNAM). She first came to Los Angeles in 1971, when she was hired to restore David Alfaro Siqueiros' América Tropical mural. She and Jaime Mejía opted to preserve the mural at the time. Quezada worked with Shifra Goldman and Jesús Salvador Treviño to document the mural and the work done to preserve it. Quezada spent around thirty years living in the United States.

In 2005, Quezada was honored by the Jalisco Secretary of Culture for her decades of work as an artist.

Quezada died in Mexico in 2012.

== Art ==
Quezada made two murals in Mexico and twelve in Los Angeles. She was also a noted photographer. The Los Angeles Times wrote in 1975 that her "laborious bordertown genre scenes need to break out of a stiff, confining style." Quezada's work connected "women's labor in Latin America to Chicana labor in the United States." Oscar Castillo who has documented the work of Chicano artists, said that she gained inspiration from family in friends when choosing what to paint.

In 1978, a mural she designed, Tree of Knowledge, or the "Read" mural, was completed by artists from the Chicana Action Service Center (CASC). Tree of Knowledge uses symbols to emphasize understanding one's own "historical roots," and is also a celebration of "the community of readers." The mural was restored by the Social and Public Art Resource Center (SPARC) in 2012.

Quezada created a mural with Michael Schnorr for Chula Vista High School in 1982. In 1983, she was part of a show of mural art at El Centro Cultural de la Raza at Balboa Park.

Her work was featured and honored in the Second Women's Biennial of photographers in 2005 in Guadalajara.
