= Magdalena Mora =

Mexican activist and writer (1952–1981)

Magdalena Mora (1952 – May 28, 1981) was a Mexican activist, feminist, labor organizer, scholar, and writer.

== Biography ==
Born in Tlalpujahua, Michoacán she was the daughter of Magdaleno Mora, who was a miner and railroad worker, and Esther Mora Torres. She moved with members of her family to San Jose, California, where she attended Abraham Lincoln High School and worked at the Del Monte Foods plant. Mora graduated from the University of California, Berkeley before working on her doctorate at the University of California, Los Angeles. An activist, she was associated with Centro de Acción Social Autónomo-Hermandad General de Trabajadores (CASA-HGT) and United Mexican American Students (UMAS), and fought for labor rights while still a student. She served as an editor for Sin Fronteras. Diagnosed with brain cancer in 1977, Mora eventually returned to Mexico and died in Tialpuhajua. Casa Magdalena Mora, a UC Berkeley residential theme program, was named in her honor.

== Selected works ==
- Raiz fuerte que no se arranca
- Mexican women in the United States : struggles past and present (1980, with Adelaida R. Del Castillo)
