= Chicano Art: Resistance and Affirmation =

1990–1993 traveling art exhibit in the US

Chicano Art: Resistance and Affirmation (or CARA) was a traveling exhibit of Chicano/a artists which toured the United States from 1990 through 1993. CARA visited ten major cities and featured over 128 individual works by about 180 different Chicano/a artists. The show was also intended to visit Madrid and Mexico City. CARA was the first time a Chicano exhibit received major attention from the press and it was the first exhibit that collaborated between Chicanos and major museums in the U.S. The show was considered a "notable event in the development of Chicano art." Another unique feature of CARA was the "extensive planning" that attempted to be as inclusive as possible and which took place more than five years prior to the opening at Wight Art Gallery. All included art works were produced between 1965 thru 1985.

The final touring exhibit included paintings, murals and installations. Over forty murals were shown via slideshow. The first section of the show contained a short history of Chicanos going back to the pre-Columbian era, discussing the concept of Aztlán and including significant events up until 1965. The other areas of the exhibit were divided into themes that were representative of the Chicano movement: Feminist Visions, Reclaiming the Past, Regional Expressions and Redefining American Art. There were also three separate spaces devoted to the important Chicano collective arts movements, Asco, Los Four and the Royal Chicano Air Force. Uniquely, at the time for a museum show, the art was shown in context with the history and politics of the Chicano movement. In addition, the art shown in the exhibit was "created by Chicanos for other Chicanos."

CARA's name is also a play on words since the Spanish word for face is cara.

== History ==
The CARA exhibit was created through the joint actions of the Wight Art Gallery at the University of California, Los Angeles (UCLA) and the CARA National Advisory Committee. These two groups started planning in 1984, but the idea for the exhibit began in 1983, when Cecelia Klein, Shifra Goldman, and several graduate students (Maria de Herrera, Holly Barnet-Sanchez and Marcos Sanchez-Tranquilino) asked the new director of the Wight Art Gallery, Edith Tonelli, about creating a unique Chicano art exhibit. The Wight Art Gallery, with help from Klein and Goldman, applied for funds from the National Endowment for the Humanities (NEH). They were originally turned down because the word "Chicano" made some of the backers "uncomfortable." Other topics addressed by CARA, such as a critical stance on American cultural politics and the "myth of the melting pot" also intimidated the NEH. A second try for funds from the NEH took place in 1985 and the term Chicano was carefully explained and outlined. This time, after "considerable debate," funds were granted in 1986. The disbursement of funds took some time, however, because of controversy in Congress about censorship, funding the arts and the proposed defunding of programs. Eventually the Rockefeller Foundation stepped in and helped during the initial planning process and the implementation phases of the project.

The project rejected the conventional structure of having a single curator for the art and chose instead to collaborate on control of the art and administration. Those involved with the project were very careful to work with the Chicano community so that Chicanos could speak for themselves, rather than having an institution impose upon them. This later allowed the exhibit to become more than just an art show, but rather an "extension of the ongoing efforts of the Chicano Movement." To ensure that Chicano voices were heard, a large committee of over 40 Chicano scholars, artists and administrators was recruited and broken up into various committees to oversee, select, design and create regional task forces. An "ongoing process of negotiation" was status quo for the project.

The exhibit opened at Wight Art Gallery on September 9, 1990.

As the show toured, there were some unique ways to promote local interest. At the El Paso Museum of Art, there was a lowrider parade that initiated the opening of the show and in addition, there were several works in CARA that contained images of lowriders. The Albuquerque Museum of Art staged a lowrider car show on the opening day of the exhibit.

CARA closed after its last engagement, which was at the Museum of Art in San Antonio, Texas.

== Reception ==
There were large crowds at the exhibition in every city.

CARA challenged many art critics to look beyond what had been considered "mainstream" or "traditional" fine art. The exhibition was successful in bringing new ideas to viewers. It also challenged viewers and critics alike to see value in the intersection of politics and art. The art was considered "complex" and "contentious" and also having a "vibrant agenda." Some critics, in fact, conflated the politics of the art to such a degree that they felt the show was not about the art at all, but instead only about the message. Other critics seemed uncomfortable with the art they were viewing.

For Chicanos/as themselves, it was exciting and moving to see their own lives, culture, ideas and struggles reflected in art. Many viewers and critics expressed the feeling that "at long last Chicanos could see themselves reflected and represented...a process of both aesthetic and political validation." The exhibition inspired many young Latino people to look into their own genealogy and appreciate their Chicano roots. CARA taught many non-Latino Americans about Chicano life, history, ideology and culture. CARA also helped those in the U.S. learn to appreciate the nuanced differences between "Hispanic" and "Chicano."

== Legacy ==
CARA challenged the mainstream art world to view Chicano art as an important art movement that stands on equal footing with other well-recognized art movements. CARA also established Chicano art as something other than a "subculture" though it was often feared that the Chicano art was displayed in an academic way that would "erode" or destroy the true meaning of the art. Nevertheless, the subject matter of CARA stretched the boundaries of what traditionally could or should be shown in a museum setting. The exhibition also succeeded at "imploding myths and stereotypes that said Chicanos had no image-making lineage, or that their work could not compete aesthetically, technically, or conceptually on a national and international level."

CARA was the first exhibition of its type and set a standard for curatorial practices surrounding Chicano art and exhibits. CARA would later be used as a "template" for creating other exhibits with Chicano artists.

CARA also helped raise awareness that museums should learn to have a "close working relationship with the communities they represent," which means that there should be more diversity in the artwork shown by these organizations. In addition to working with the community to represent more diversity, it also exposed other issues, such as corporate sponsorship in museums. CARA also clearly demonstrated that there was still a critical bias towards men being represented more often than women in museums and in the arts.

Artists who showed work with CARA, like Gaspar Enriquez, found that more of their art started selling as it gained more exposure in different markets. Not all artists found themselves in the same situation, but for many, doors were opened in mainstream markets, collections, lecture circuits and museums.

CARA also filled a void that was left when many Chicano art collectives began to break down.

== Artists and venues ==
=== Artists ===
- Steve Abame
- Emilio Aguayo
- Mario Aguilar
- Juana Alicia
- Carlos Almaraz
- Cecilia Alvarez
- Guillermo Aranda
- Robert Arenivar
- Alfredo Arreguín
- David Avalos
- Adam Avilia
- Judith Baca
- "Balazo"
- Sal Barajas
- Santa Barraza
- Carlos "Moth" Barrera
- Stephanie Barrett
- Louis Carlos Bernal
- Charles "Chaz" Bojórquez
- David Rivas Botello
- M.T. Bryan
- Herlinda Bustamante
- Jesus "Chuy" Campusano
- Barbara Carrasco
- Eduardo Carrillo
- Graciela Carrillo
- Juan Carrillo
- Mel Casas
- Tomas "Coyote" Castañeda
- Mario E. Castillo
- Isabel Castro
- Juan Cervantes
- Susan Cervantes
- Yreina Cervantez
- Teresa M. Chacon
- Armando Cid
- Luis Cortazar
- Rudy Cuellar
- Roberto de la Rocha
- Maria Luisa Delgado-Partin
- Neto del Sol
- Daniel Desiga
- Aurelio Diaz
- Richard Duardo
- Gaspar Enriquez
- Carlota D. Espinoza
- Ricardo Favela
- Charles W. "Cat" Felix Jr.
- Rudy M. Fernandez
- Carlos Fresquez
- Juan R. Fuentes
- Alex Galindo
- Felipe Gallegos
- Daniel Galvez
- Jose Galvez
- Diane Gamboa
- Harry Gamboa, Jr
- Miguel A. Gandert
- Lorraine Garcia
- Max E. Garcia
- Rupert García
- Geronimo Garduño
- Alex Garza
- Carmen Lomas Garza
- Danny Gaytan
- Ignacio Gomez
- José Gamaliel González
- Jose Luis Gonzalez
- Juan Silverio Gonzalez
- Louie "The Foot" González
- Gronk (artist)
- David Diaz Guerrero
- Zarco Guerrero
- Gilberto Guzman
- Ruben Guzman
- Richard Haro
- Wayne Alaniz Healy
- Ester Hernandez
- Juan Hernandez
- Willie Herrón
- Frank V. Hinojosa
- Juanita Jaramillo
- Luis Jimenez
- Richard Jimenez
- Gustavo Kasillas
- Carlos Cortéz Koyokuikatl
- Francisco LeFebre
- Irma Lerma Barbosa
- Liz Lerma Bowerman
- Luis LeRoy
- Samuel Leyba
- Mano Lima
- Leo Limón
- Samuel Llamas
- David A. Lopez
- Yolanda M. López
- Linda Lucero
- Gilbert "Magu" Luján
- Tony Machado
- Mike Maestas
- Ralph Maradiaga
- César A. Martínez
- Emanuel Martinez
- Ernesto Martinez
- Rudy Martinez
- Santos Martínez
- Consuelo Mendez
- Vicente Mendoza
- Amalia Mesa-Bains
- Richard Montez
- Delilah Montoya
- Gina Montoya
- José Montoya
- Malaquías Montoya
- Martin Moreno
- Celia Álvarez Muñoz
- Jose Nario
- Osha Neumann
- Victor Ochoa
- Miriam Olivo
- Rodolfo B. Ornelas
- Lee Orona
- Juanishi Orosco
- Stan Padilla
- Ernesto Palmino
- Raymond M. Patlán
- Antonio Pazos
- Amado M. Peña Jr.
- Antonia A. Perez
- Antonio Perez
- Irene Perez
- Rosa M. Quezada
- David Ramirez
- Joe B. Ramos
- Marcos Raya
- Michael Rios
- Sam Rios
- Patricia Rivera
- Celia Rodriguez
- Gabriel Rodriguez
- Joe Bastida Rodriguez
- Manuel "Spain" Rodriguez
- Patricia Rodriguez
- Pedro A. Rodriguez
- Peter Rodríguez
- Richard Rodriguez
- Arturo Roman
- Frank Romero
- Tere Romo
- Carlos Rosas
- Richard Rueda
- Al Sanchez
- Fred Sanchez
- Thelma Heavilin Sanchez
- Vivian Sanchez
- Teddy Sandoval
- Carlos Santistevan
- Edward Serros
- Leo Tanguma
- O'Brian Thiele
- David Tineo
- Mario Acevedo Torero
- Anastacio Torres
- Salvador Roverto Torres
- David Torrez
- Rubén Trejo
- Jesse Treviño
- Rudy R. Treviño
- Manuel Unzueta
- John Valadez
- Patssi Valdez
- Susan Valdez Torres
- Linda Vallejo
- Ricardo Valverde
- Kathy Vargas
- Emigdio Vasquez
- Salvador Vega
- Manuel Venegas
- Esteban Villa
- Xavier Viramontes
- Larry Yáñez
- René Yañez
- Andrew Sanchez Zermeño

=== Venues ===
- Wight Art Gallery at University of California, Los Angeles
- San Francisco Museum of Modern Art
- Fresno Art Museum
- Tucson Museum of Art
- Denver Art Museum
- Albuquerque Museum of Art and History
- National Museum of American Art, Washington, DC
- Bronx Museum of the Arts
- El Paso Museum of Art
- San Antonio Museum of Art

== Quotes ==
"We made valiant efforts to things through--every one of these sessions became a philosophical discussion...In fact, I feel like I've been through an incredible course in Chicanismo."—Judith Baca

"I loved this exhibit. It's like looking in a mirror. It's really seeing the heart of my people."—Anonymous

== Read More ==
Castillo, Richard Griswold Del; McKenna, Teresa; Yarbro-Bejarano, Yvonne, eds. (1991). Chicano Art: Resistance and Affirmation. Los Angeles, California: Wight Art Gallery. pp. 26–32. ISBN 0943739152.
