= Southside Park, Sacramento, California =

Neighborhood in Sacramento, California, USA

Coordinates: 38.5695°N 121.5006°W

Southside Park is a neighborhood in Sacramento, California, located immediately south of Downtown Sacramento. Its official borders are R Street to the north, W-X Freeway to the south, I-5 to the west, and 12th Street to the east.

Southside Park is part of the City of Sacramento's South Side Historic District. A large park with a natural pond sits at the center of the community. The park hosts several annual celebrations and the popular Sunday Farmers Market is held all year south of the park under the overpass at W-X Streets.

== History ==
=== Native inhabitants ===
The area was originally inhabited by the Valley Nisenan people for several thousand years. What is now Southside Park Lake was then a larger marshy pond that extended further south toward what is now Broadway and further north toward R Street. Nearby high ground would have been their preferred sites for their towns, which were scattered throughout. One of the largest ones, Sama, was a little south of here and was home to several hundred or perhaps over 1000 people. It was also their southernmost town; further south was Miwok land. The Nisenan were decimated (though not eliminated) by new diseases and hostility from the influx of outsiders in the 1800s.

=== Settlement ===
The area around what is now the park is a natural low spot (the lowest in what is now the Central City) and was subject to seasonal flooding. As such, development in the growing city of Sacramento was at first confined to north of the R Street levee, and a sewage canal ran along 6th Street south of R starting in 1864. Later, construction of a levee at Y Street (now Broadway) made it possible to build south of R Street, and the neighborhood began to be established around the turn of the 20th century. Many residents worked at the nearby railyards, canneries, and lumberyards. The population included Portuguese, Japanese, Italians, Slavs, Africans, and others; non-whites were not allowed to live in certain other parts of the city until the late 1960s. In fact, the Fong Mansion across from the park's playground at 6th & U was built in 1936 by a Chinese diplomat who was not allowed to build where he originally wanted to in East Sacramento.

=== Southside Park ===
The park was created by the city about 100 years ago, at the urging of members of Southside Improvement Club, an organization of local residents that still exists and still meets monthly in the basement of St. Elizabeth's Church at 12th & S. The city bought the land in 1906, but the park took a number of years to build. The sewage canal was filled in, and the lake was dredged to make it deeper and to provide fill to raise the rest of the park area to its current level. The city hired Rudolph A. Herold, George Randle, and John McClaren (the landscape architect for San Francisco's Golden Gate Park) to landscape the park.

The amphitheater was built in 1934 and was named after Robert Callahan, former Southside Improvement Club member and County Supervisor. He is buried in the Sacramento Historic City Cemetery (aka Old City Cemetery) on Broadway.

The park has always been popular as both a day-to-day refuge for residents in the neighborhood and the entire city and for special events. "In 1939, California celebrated its centennial ... Sacramento held a three-month celebration in Southside Park called Roaring Camp. From May until August, the southern end of Southside Park became a California mining town. More than 50 structures constructed especially for Roaring Camp were built, many based loosely on actual buildings located in Sacramento or other California cities." A few of the buildings were retained after Roaring Camp. One was used as a draftee induction center during World War II.

For some time, there were boats that could be rented for pleasure rides on the lake. For years, the city held its Fourth of July celebrations in Southside Park, sending up fireworks from the island. Cesar Chavez' historic United Farm Workers march from Delano to Sacramento in 1966 came to Southside Park and Our Lady of Guadalupe Church across the street. Cinco de Mayo celebrations were an annual event at Southside Park during the 1970s and 1980s until they outgrew the park, moved elsewhere, and were redesignated as "Festival de Familia".

The park currently hosts the Labor Council for Latin American Advancement (LCLAA)'s annual Cesar Chavez Day march and rally, which is centered on the Amphitheater.

The park originally extended all the way to X Street, but construction of the W-X Freeway in the 1960s severed both the park and the lake, reducing the size of the park by 40%, and eliminating one of the lake's two islands. Construction of the freeway also caused severe disruption in the neighborhood and the park, and the area deteriorated for many years. The area around 4th & T became known as "Hooker Hollow" and the park became a haven for drug use and crime. Since the 1970s, neighbors have been working to clean up the park and surrounding area, and in recent years, the city has invested in improvements, such as the clubhouse, the playground, and the improved lakeshore landscaping and fence. Criminal activity is greatly reduced and the park is popular with families.

The lake is precious habitat for wildlife, including fish, birds, turtles, crayfish, and more. There are just over 300 trees in the park, representing over forty species.

=== Southside Park mural ===
The multi-panel mural on the Amphitheater was originally painted in 1977 by members of the Royal Chicano Air Force (RCAF), a long-time Sacramento group of Chicano artists and activists. The contributing artists were Juan Cervantes (artist), Lorraine Garcia-Nakata, José Montoya, Juanishi Orosco, Stan Padilla, Sam Rios, and Esteban Villa. Measuring 14 feet x 110 feet (25,000 square feet), the mural features themes related to the Mexican and Chicano heritage of many Southside neighborhood residents, including Pre-Columbian motifs such as the Aztec eagle, images from Mexican revolutionary history, the work of the United Farm Workers union, and indigenous cultures of the Americas. The mural was restored in 2001. RCAF member Esteban Villa returned to sing at a neighborhood event in the park in 2010.

== Points of interest ==
- Southside Park - City of Sacramento Parks and Recreation Site
- Verge Center for the Arts
