= Juanishi Orosco =

Juan "Juanishi" V. Orosco (1945-2023) was an American Chicano artist and muralist. His work is heavily tied to the Chicano Movement. Based in Sacramento, along with Jose Montoya, Estaban Villa, and Ricardo Favela he cofounded the Royal Chicano Airforce (RCAF). He achieved recognition for his work both locally and nationally, with his collections being held at the Smithsonian American Art Museum, Harvard University, and Yale University. Dedicating his life to serving his community and enhancing young people's opportunities to pursue art.

== Biography ==
Juan Orosco was born in Lincoln, California on February 18th, 1945. Despite being born in Lincoln, Orosco and his family lived in Rancho Cordova. Being surrounded by an agricultural community, at a young age Orosco worked on a ranch alongside his family, which is the reason behind his advocacy for agricultural workers.

After graduating high school in the mid-sixties, prior to enrolling in a college or university, Orosco was drafted into the Army due to the Vietnam War. Serving in the Army for two years in the 101 Airborne Division before being released and sent home, having never set foot in Vietnam.

Upon his return home, Orosco enrolled at American River College before transferring in 1969 to the California State University, Sacramento. Having heard of two Chicano artists who taught there, Orosco met Professors José Montoya and Esteban Villa at an exhibit and began to study under them. In 1969, alongside like-minded artists such as Jose Montoya, Esteban Villa, Ricardo Favela and Rudy Cuellar, he started the Rebel Chicano Art Front (which later became known as the Royal Chicano Air Force). A collective dedicated to making bilingual and bicultural art programs for the Chicano community in the greater Sacramento area.

Quickly after the RCAF's creation, Orosco and its other founders began to create posters for the United Farm Workers, working in multiple capacities for the organization. Serving as both art educators and engaging in community outreach. Artwork from this period was featured in the renowned art exhibition Chicano Art: Resistance and Affirmation. Notably this exhibition was the first national showcase of Latinx art and traveled through 10 national museums, running from 1990-1993.

Through the RCAF, in 1972 Orosco helped to create the Centro de Artistas Chicanos. A nonprofit organization that developed other community programs in Sacramento such as La Nueva Raza Bookstore, the Barrio Art Program, and the RCAF Graphics and Design Center.

== Artistic style ==
Orosco's mural work can be closely associated with its use of geometric abstraction and its iconography. Primarily Orosco utilized indigenous visuals in his artwork and heavy connections could be drawn to Aztec and Hopi cultures through his art. An approach that made Orosco's work different to his peer's social realistic style. Intending to reconnect Chicano communities to their pre-Columbian heritage, he employed symbolic forms to assert the "neo-Amerindian" identities that tied his community together.

In addition to muralism, Orosco was a prolific printmaker whose work was pivotal to community organizing efforts. His contributions were central to the Royal Chicano Air Force's community outreach work as well as their work with the United Farm Workers. Having drawn on influences from traditional Chicano graphics, Orosco is credited with using prints to mobilize Chicano communities to claim their social identities in public spaces. As well as aiding in the Chicano printmaking transition period (1970s-1980s) from strictly political posters to fine arts prints.

== Legacy ==
As a central figure in the Chicano art movement and having been featured in the first major national Latinx art exhibit, Orosco's physical works are held in permanent collections in major American Art Institutions such as the Smithsonian American Art Museum. His murals remain viewable by the public and are accessible across California and Oregon.

Outside of his own art, Juan Orosco is recognized for his service to his community as an educator and mentor. He described himself as an artist who worked "in the community, for the community, by the community." Providing art training and outreach to hundreds of young artists across the Western coast.

Juan Orosco died in 2023. A Celebration of Life was held at the Washington Neighborhood Center in Sacramento.

== Education and mentorship ==
Orosco taught alongside Montoya and Villa at the University of California Sacramento, teaching silkscreen printing techniques, muralism, painting, and drawing. Outside of his work at the University, he worked directly with MEChA students across northern California High Schools developing his own programs teaching mural and silkscreen printing. One of Orosco's most consistent forms of community engagement between the 1960s and the 1980's. Orosco, through The Royal Chicano Air Force, also helped established youth programs that brought art education to youth offenders within the California Youth Authority.

Orosco and RCAF spent about 20 years traveling across the United States to different universities and community centers to teach art classes, conducting performances, and workshops. Alongside his work with the RCAF and the Centro de Artistas Chicanos, Orosco also served as the program director of the Sacramento Metropolitan Arts Commission and was a frequent visitor for 25 years to local schools as an exemplary artist through the California Arts Council. Orosco also held a position as a board member of La Raza Galeria Posada while simultaneously serving on the board for the Center of Contemporary Art.

On November 14, 2013, Orosco utilized his position as a founding member of RCAF to recruit new members to form the North Division of the Royal Chicano Air Force in Salem, Oregon. Establishing the RCAF's first branch and expanding their mission outside of Sacramento for the first time.

== Notable works and murals ==
- Leyes, Chicano Park (1975). San Diego, California
- Mandala, Chicano Park (1975). San Diego, California
- Amphitheater Mural, Southside Park (1980). Sacramento, California
- Metamorphosis, 3rd and L Streets (1980). Sacramento, California
- The History of the Farmworker, CAPACES Leadership Institute (2013). Woodburn, Oregon
- Flight, Golden 1 Center (2018). Sacramento, California
