= RCAF (disambiguation) =

RCAF may refer to:

- Royal Cambodian Armed Forces, Cambodia's military, including the army, navy, air force and military police
  - Royal Cambodian Air Force
- Royal Canadian Air Farce, a comedy troupe which starred in their own radio and television shows
- Royal Canadian Air Force, the name of Canada's air force from 1924 to 1968, and from 2011–Present
- Royal Ceylon Air Force, the Sri Lankan air force from 1948 to 1973
- Royal Chicano Air Force, a collective of artists based in Sacramento, California
