= Rasquachismo =

Theory of Chicano aesthetics

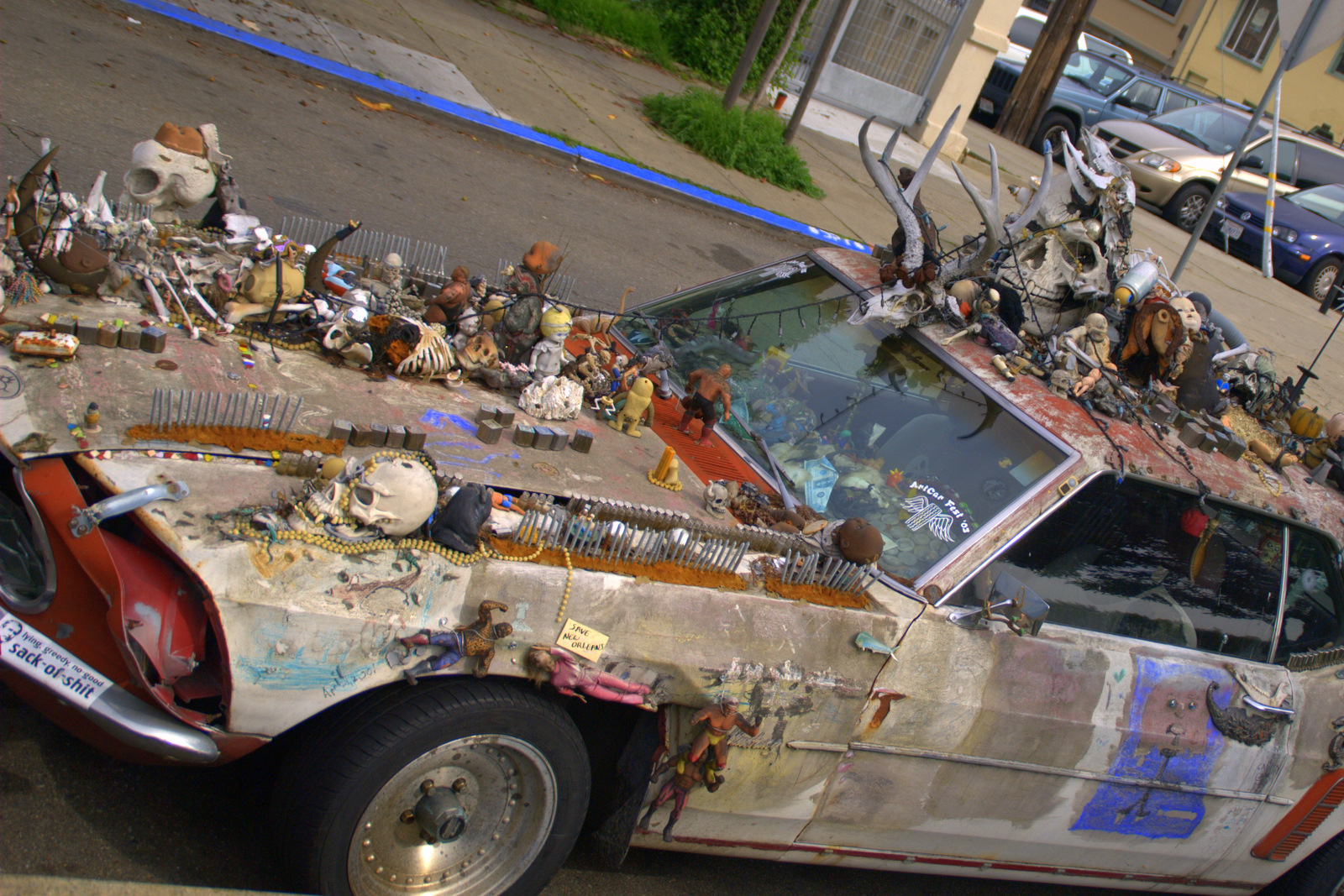
A rasquache-style ornamented car, Mission District, San Francisco

Rasquachismo (also known as rascuachismo or rasquache/rascuache style) is a theory developed by Chicano scholar Tomás Ybarra-Frausto to describe "a perspective of the oppressed, a view from los de abajo" in working class Chicano communities that uses elements of "hybridization, juxtaposition and integration" as a means of empowerment and resistance. Rasquachismo is commonly used to describe the aesthetics present in working class Chicano art and Mexican art movements that "make the most from the least." It has been described as a worldview, the "view of the oppressed, which combines inventiveness with a survivalist attitude." Artists often represent experiences of their own life in the "barrio" or the experiences of being Mexican and Chicano. This art movement has also been defined by artists and scholar Amalia Mesa-Bains "as a survivalist irreverence ('based on sustaining elements of Mexican tradition and lived encounters in a hostile environment') that functioned as a vehicle of cultural continuity."

Rasquachismo is rooted in the older term rasquache, which is the English form of the Spanish term rascuache, of Nahuatl origin. While the term was widely used as a classist slur, it has been reclaimed to highlight the creativity and uniqueness in Chicano and Mexican working-class communities. Beyond being simply frugal, the rasquache philosophy also involves inventing new uses for conventional objects. This may mean giving a new function to something that would conventionally be considered broken or otherwise 'useless.'

== Term ==
The Spanish term rascuache is used in Mexico, El Salvador and Honduras, where it carries negative connotations of low social standing or poor taste. Everyday behaviors such as reusing plastic utensils or zip-lock bags could be described as "rasquache" disparagingly by those of upper classes. Ybarra-Frausto coined the term rasquachismo in 1989.

== Development ==
The Chicano movement began to develop in the 1960s, focusing primarily on the struggles and identity of Mexican-Americans. This allowed Chicano art to also begin in the 1960s, when artists used different media to highlight the social and cultural aspects of being Mexican-American. This movement became a form of resistance for Chicanos to represent themselves in a political and social climate marked by anti-Latino discrimination.

Ybarra-Frausto first published the essay "Rasquachismo: A Chicano Sensibility" in 1989 in the exhibition catalogue for a show organized by MARS (Movimiento Artístico del Río Salado), a Chicano artist group and gallery based in Phoenix, Arizona. Drawing in part on Susan Sontag's writings on camp, Ybarra-Frausto examined forms and imagery across Chicano literature, theater, consumer culture, neighborhoods and self-presentation. The essay was later reprinted in the 1991 exhibition catalogue Chicano Art: Resistance and Affirmation (CARA), retitled "Rasquachismo: A Chicano Sensibility," significantly broadening its reach within the field of Chicano cultural studies.

According to Ybarra-Frausto, rasquachismo codifies all Chicano cultural production, including theater, literature and plastic arts. The scholar notes that although Mexican vernacular rasquache traditions influence Chicano art, the rasquachismo that has evolved in the United States presents a "bicultural sensibility." The central themes of Chicano art include identity, religion, immigration, racism and classism. Chicano art frequently engages with political themes, including critiques of government policy and social inequality, functioning as a form of protest in which vibrant colors are combined with the attitude and elements of rasquachismo.

== Artistic context ==
In the artistic context, the term is used to describe art that overcomes material and professional limitations faced by artists. Rasquache art uses the most basic, simple, quick, and crude means necessary to achieve the desired expression, prioritizing ingenuity over conventional resources.

Amalia Mesa-Bains, artist and writer, writes that "In rasquachismo, the irreverent and spontaneous are employed to make the most from the least... one has a stance that is both defiant and inventive. Aesthetic expression comes from discards, fragments, even recycled everyday materials... The capacity to hold life together with bits of string, old coffee cans, and broken mirrors in a dazzling gesture of aesthetic bravado is at the heart of rasquachismo." When employed by female artists, she calls it Domesticana, but cautions that these terms should not be understood as applying to all Chicano artists. Making the most with the least is a statement of irreverence and is both "defiant and inventive," what Ybarra-Frausto has called the "good taste of bad taste."

=== Lowriders ===
Lowrider culture is widely recognized as an expression of rasquachismo within Chicano communities. The slow-cruising, hydraulic-modified cars—often featuring elaborate custom paint jobs, airbrushed murals and chrome detailing—represent a polished, methodical form of the rasquache aesthetic, transforming everyday objects into statements of identity and pride. Lowriding originated in the 1930s and flourished in Southwestern Chicano communities during the postwar era, becoming a lasting vehicle for Chicano and Mexican-American cultural identity. The connection between lowriders and rasquachismo was further cemented during the CARA traveling exhibition (1990–1993), which featured several works incorporating lowrider imagery and, at the El Paso Museum of Art, was inaugurated with a lowrider parade.

== Parameters of "Rasquachismo" ==
There has been questioning of whether this art form can be considered fine art due to its use of unconventional materials and how the art movement has been recorded. Rasquachismo was not created to oppose standards of fine art, but emerged from communities creating art out of ingenuity and lived experience.

Scholar Alicia Gaspar de Alba, founding faculty of the UCLA Department of Chicana/o Studies, has broken rasquachismo down into three degrees. The first degree is not attached to fine art at all—it is the backyard altar built from an upcycled bathtub. The second degree is the commercialized appropriation of Chicano symbols for mass consumption, such as the Taco Bell Chihuahua or an image of the Virgin of Guadalupe on a T-shirt. The third degree is the fine art application of the rasquache sensibility, where artists consciously engage with the aesthetic in a gallery or museum context.

Artists employ a range of media including serigraphs, paintings, ofrendas, and objects found within Latino households, grounding the work in the material conditions and everyday life of working-class Mexican and Mexican-American communities.

== Scholarly reception ==
Following the wider circulation of Ybarra-Frausto's essay through the CARA catalogue, rasquachismo became a canonical, and contested, concept in Chicano cultural studies. In 1998, Ramón García, professor at California State University, Northridge, published "Against Rasquache: Chicano Identity and the Politics of Popular Culture in Los Angeles" in Crítica: A Journal of Critical Essays. García argued that rasquachismo, as theorized by Ybarra-Frausto, did not adequately account for the diversity of Chicano subject positions, and that camp involves a more conscious and critical engagement with working-class culture than rasquachismo alone could capture. García concluded that multiple forms of Chicano aesthetics—including camp and kitsch—must be recognized alongside rasquachismo as valid modes of resistance. García's essay also drew attention to the role of Chicana feminism and queer politics in exposing and countering patriarchal and heteronormative tendencies within Chicano culture more broadly.

In 2025, the McNay Art Museum in San Antonio, Texas, mounted "Rasquachismo: 35 Years of a Chicano Sensibility," an exhibition featuring more than 50 paintings, sculptures and installations by artists including Juan de Dios Mora, Miki Rodriguez and Luis Jimenez. Organized by Mia Lopez, curator of Latinx art, the exhibition brought together works spanning a range of rasquache interpretations—from assemblage and found objects to conceptual and folk-inspired approaches—united by what the museum described as an embrace of "exuberance, inventiveness, and hybridity."

== Artists ==
=== Ester Hernández ===
Ester Hernández, born in the San Joaquin Valley in California, is known for her print work and serigraphs within the Chicano art movement. A Chicana artist of Yaqui and Mexican heritage, she comes from a family of farm workers and was a pioneer activist of the Chicano Arts Movement since the 1960s. Her art centers on Indigenous and Latina women, employing political iconographies to address themes of social justice, civil rights and the farm workers movement.

Her most recognized work is Sun Mad (1982), a serigraph that critiques American agribusiness by transforming the iconic Sun Maid Raisins image into a skeleton, to highlight the toxic effects of pesticides on farm workers and the environment. The work was later reworked as a multidimensional installation at the National Museum of Mexican Art in Chicago, incorporating rasquache elements such as an ofrenda with objects associated with farm workers. This piece exemplifies how rasquachismo can be multifaceted in its political message while centering Chicano identity.

=== Amalia Mesa-Bains ===
Amalia Mesa-Bains, born in Santa Clara, California, is a multidisciplinary artist, curator and author known for coining the term "domesticana". MacArthur Fellowship recipient in 1993, she specializes in installations that explore gender dynamics within Chicana culture.

Her essay "Domesticana: The Sensibility of Chicana Rasquache" (1995) theorizes domesticana as an "aesthetic modality that testifies to the artistic counter-narratives of the domestic vernacular" of Chicana women. Her installations repurpose Mexican household objects, transforming home altar practices into contemporary works. In her work Cihuateotl with Mirror in Private Landscapes and Public Territories (1997), the sculpture combines mixed media including LED lighting, candles, crushed glass and blown glass.

== Quotes on Rasquachismo ==
According to Chicana/o art scholar Tomás Ybarra-Frausto, rasquachismo should be considered first as an attitude and a sensibility, and secondarily as a set of formal art qualities...

— Josh T. Franco, Latino collections specialist for the Smithsonian's Archives of American Art

== See also ==
- Self Help Graphics & Art
- DIY ethic
- Repurposing
- Border art
- Lowrider
- Chicano Art: Resistance and Affirmation
