= Wide Open Walls (Sacramento Mural Festival) =

American annual street art event

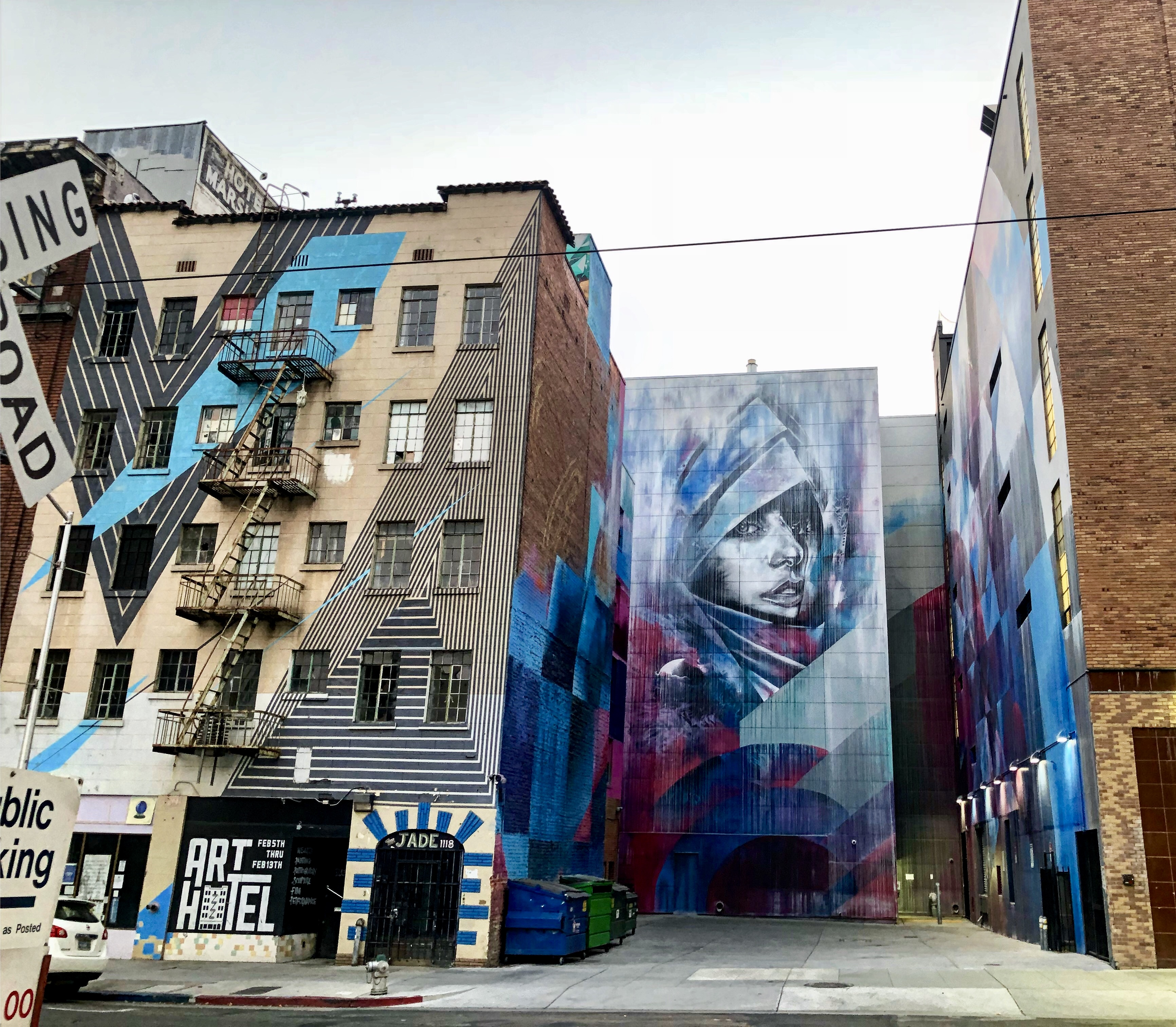
- Mural by Christina Angelina
- Locations: Sacramento, CA, US
- Founded: 2016
- Founders: David Sobon and Friends of the Sacramento Arts Commission
- Organizer: David Sobon, Margaret Owens, Mike Stalter, Raphael Delgado, and Zayn Silmi
- Website: wideopenwalls.com

Wide Open Walls (Sacramento Mural Festival) is an annual street art event held in Sacramento, California. The Friends of the Sacramento Metropolitan Arts Commission conceived of the event as a fundraiser for public arts education and developed it with constituents from the civic, business, education, and arts sectors to build on the city's cultural economy.

Founders established the interactive art event to engage both Sacramento residents and visitors to the state capital. The festival sponsors local, national, and international artists who gather for ten days in late August to produce monumental work on structures throughout the metropolitan area. After the success of its inaugural year, the festival inspired both state institutions and private building owners to donate walls for enduring works of public art.

== Artists ==
Some notable artists who have participated in Wide Open Walls include: Add Fuel, Apexer, Camille Rose Garcia, Christina Angelina (a.k.a. Starfighter), Few and Far Women (collective), Herakut, John Pugh, John Horton, Jorit Agoch, Maren Conrad, Okuda, Phlegm, Raphael Delgado, Shepard Fairey, Shamisa Hassani, Sonya Fe, Stan Padilla, and Tavar Zawacki.

== History ==
=== 2016 ===
The inaugural Sacramento Mural Festival in 2016 hosted a dozen artists who painted city walls over an eight-day period in August. The festival was primarily held on the city grid in Midtown where artists could be easily viewed painting large scale murals by pedestrians and cyclists. The festival included tours, presentations, pop-up events, and a final rooftop party.

=== 2017 ===
The 2017 Sacramento Mural Festival was renamed Wide Open Walls (WOW) by festival organizers. Local, national, and international mural, street, and graffiti artists were hired to paint more than thirty murals on city walls throughout the metropolitan area.

=== 2018 ===
In 2018 Wide Open Walls received some national attention as the city hosted the opening of Sacramento native Greta Gerwig's film Lady Bird which had been filmed in the city. Prior to the opening of the festival film was commemorated with a mural painted by local artist Maren Conrad. Festival attendees were also able tow view the creation of Shepard Fairey's fifteen story mural of Johnny Cash standing in front of Folsom Prison. Fairey conceived the image as part of his “American Civics Project” series and painted the mural in "hopes the artwork will prompt discussion of mass incarceration and the for-profit prison industry in America." Festival organizers continued to promote local artists who shared the diverse perspectives, philosophies, experiences, and heritage that make up the city and state. Of note is the work of Stan Padilla, a member of the Royal Chicano Air Force, honoring the collective with a mural on the Golden 1 Center and California State University, Sacramento which donated a wall to a collaborative work completed by its alumni: SV Williams, Phillip Altstatt, John Horton, Raphael Delgado, Molly Devlin, Micah Crandall-Bear, Lopan and Ernie Fresh, Norm Ayles, Ursula X. Young, and Jose Di Gregorio. In 2018 the festival was recognized by the Arts & Business Council of the Sacramento Region and won the Sacramento Region Innovation of the Year Award.

=== 2019 ===
The 2019 festival continued to showcase diverse perspectives in street art expanding into Sacramento communities traditionally underserved by its economy. California natives Raphael Delgado and Kirileigh Jones created colorful floral works to large city walls, while British artist (and sometime Sacramento resident) David Puck painted a series of murals concerned with mental health awareness. Los Angeles artist Eliseo Art Silva, who immigrated to California from the Philippines, contributed a mural depicting the Filipino migration to a wall at California State University, Sacramento, which also provided walls for artists Hoxxoh and Jilian Evelyn.

=== 2020 ===
A scaled down version of the festival took place in September 2020 and featured works by Sacramento and Bay Area artists.

== Criticism ==
After the 2017 festival some local residents raised concerns that an investment in public art within was signaling the gentrification of the city to appeal to the creative class, potentially impacting the cost of living in low-income neighborhoods that are often populated with Brown and Black people. Local muralist and WOW contributor Aik Brown expresses his motivation for adding his art on the walls of the community he grew up in, "I feel that my work provides a sense of peace, love, and happiness while also dealing with and discussing societal issues around race, politics, violence by the police, and living in America while Black. I am creating a new body of work that will focus on these issues...through family, nature, and spirituality."
