= Carlota D. EspinoZa =

American painter

Carlota d.R. EspinoZa (born 10 January 1943, Denver, Colorado) is a Chicana muralist, artist, and activist in the Chicano community in Denver. She is one of the early muralists and activists of the Chicano Movement, and many of her major works were produced alongside fellow activists in Denver in the 1960s and 70s. Along with murals, EspinoZa's career has included work with screenprinting and dioramas.

== Early life and education ==
Carlota d.R EspinoZa (born Charlotte Delaine Espinoza) grew up in Fraser, Colorado as the middle child of 14 siblings. EspinoZa stylizes her name in homage to her maternal grandparents, with the uppercase "R" acknowledging her maternal grandmother (surname Romero) and the uppercase "Z" acknowledging her maternal grandfather (surname Zamora). She graduated from the Rocky Mountain School of Art (now Rocky Mountain College of Art and Design) after completing a high school equivalency program.

== Career ==
=== Murals ===
==== Mexican Heroes ====
EspinoZa painted Mexican Heroes, (also called A Tribute to Three Mexican Heroes or The Three Mexican Heroes) in the 1960s for the Chicano art gallery El Grito de Aztlán, located in the Crusade for Justice headquarters in Denver. Crusade for Justice was a community organization founded by activist Rodolfo "Corky" Gonzales in 1966 to advocate for Chicano civil rights. The mural, painted on canvas, depicts three key figures in Mexican history: Benito Juárez, Pancho Villa, and Emiliano Zapata.

Mexican Heroes was originally created as part of a set of two murals, with its companion mural Las Mujeres also hanging in the gallery. However, after a 1973 gunfight between Crusade activists and police that resulted in an explosion near the headquarters, and a 1988 fire that destroyed the then-vacant building, the second mural was destroyed and Mexican Heroes was damaged.

Carlos Santístevan, founder of the original gallery that housed Mexican Heroes, recovered the mural after the fire and in May of 2020, it was put on display at the Rodolfo "Corky" Gonzales Branch of the Denver Public Library.

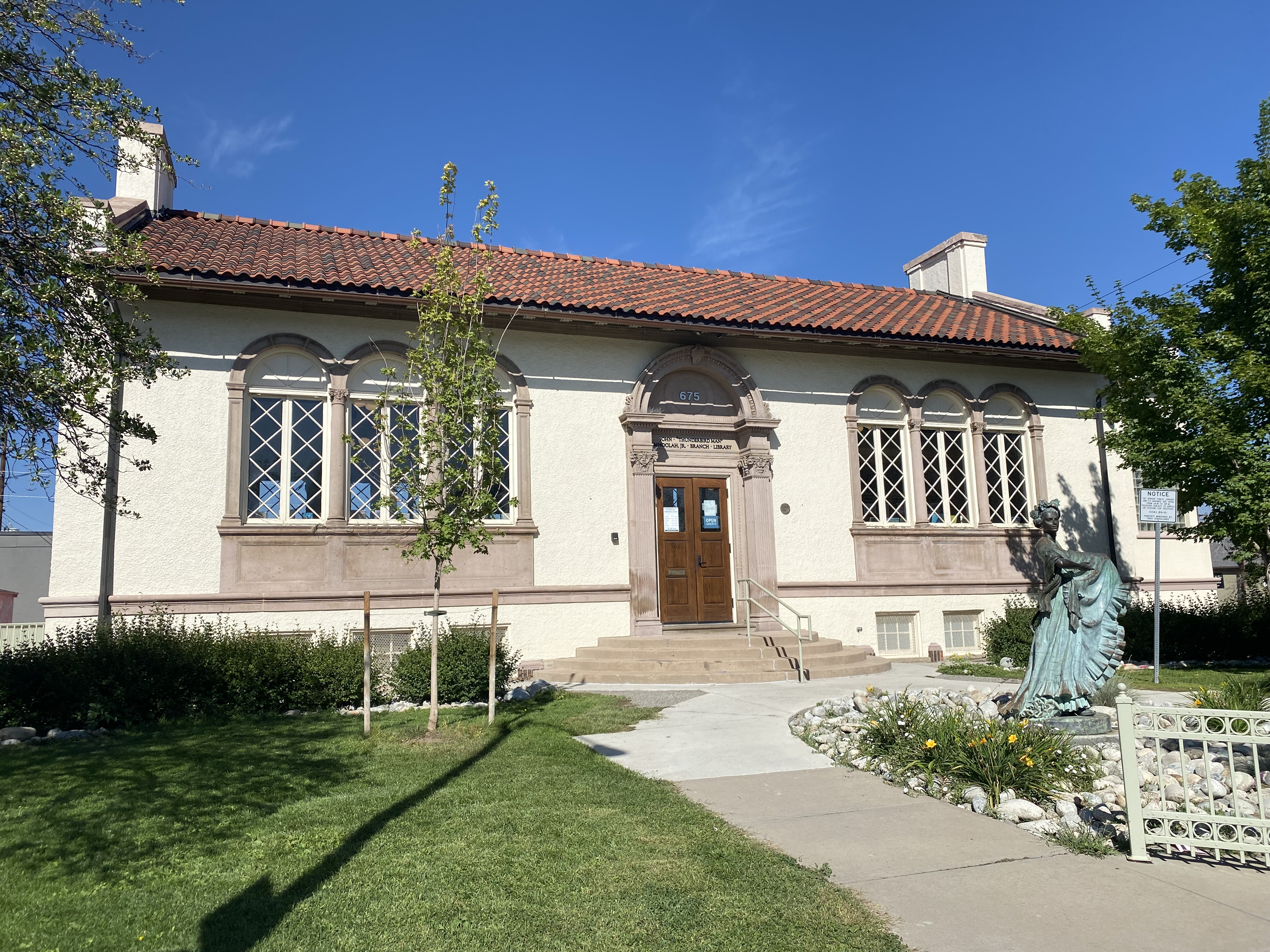
The John "Thunderbird Man" Emhoolah, Jr. Branch of the Denver Public Library houses EspinoZa's mural Pasado, Presente, Futuro.

==== Pasado, Presente, Futuro ====
The Friends of the Denver Public Library commissioned EspinoZa to paint Pasado, Presente, Futuro in 1975. It was installed above the circulation desk in the Byers Branch (now the John "Thunderbird Man" Emhoolah, Jr. Branch) of the library. This two-panel mural depicts a range of subjects connected to both Mexican and U.S. history.

===== Mural of Our Lady of Guadalupe =====
EspinoZa painted a mural of Our Lady of Guadalupe in 1977 for Our Lady of Guadalupe Catholic Church in Denver at the request of former pastor Father José Lara. Lara reportedly told EspinoZa to incorporate elements of Denver Chicana identity into Our Lady's likeness instead of trying to directly imitate her original image at the Basilica of Our Lady of Guadalupe in Mexico City. The mural stood behind the church altar for 32 years until 2009, when priest Father Benito Hernández joined the parish and decided the mural distracted churchgoers from focusing on the sanctity of the altar.

Hernández ordered a wall to be built between the altar and EspinoZa's mural to hide the image of Our Lady from view, which spurred protest from some community members. A group that called themselves Faithful United assembled to advocate for the wall's removal, gathering signatures and presenting a letter to the Archdiocese of Denver to demand the mural's visibility at the church. Ultimately, the wall remained standing, and the mural was vandalized several months later when the word "enough" in Spanish was spray painted across it.

==== Escuela Tlatelolco ====
EspinoZa also painted a mural for the exterior entryway of Denver school Escuela Tlatelolco. Escuela Tlatelolco was founded by Rodolfo "Corky" Gonzales and opened in 1970, during the height of the Chicano movement, as a private school for historically disadvantaged Hispanic and Latino students to pursue quality education while still engaging with their cultures. In 2002, EspinoZa received a "Spirit of Tlatelolco" award from the school for her artwork and embodiment of the school's mission. Although the Escuela closed in 2017 due to funding issues, and EspinoZa's mural was removed afterwards, there are ongoing community initiatives in Denver to fund a new art installation at the site.

=== Other work ===
==== We the People/Broken Treaties, Broken Promises ====
We the People (originally titled Broken Treaties, Broken Promises) is a screen print that features a nude woman holding a dove, framed by the colors and patterns of the American flag. EspinoZa created We the People in 1988 as part of the National Chicano Screenprint Taller. The Taller was a workshop that invited Chicano artists across the United States to gain national exposure by creating screen prints related to the mission statement of the larger Chicano Art: Resistance and Affirmation (CARA) exhibition. After being made and displayed in Los Angeles, the print was incorporated into the Smithsonian American Art Museum's digital collection.

==== Early Denver Diorama ====
EspinoZa worked at the Denver Museum of Nature and Science in the 1970s and 80s. During this time, she worked on various projects in the Foreground and Exhibit Production departments, including several dioramas. Most notably, EspinoZa did restoration work in the 1980s for a diorama of early Denver made from wax sculptures and plaster. She was involved in an additional round of restorations on the diorama in the 2010s when the piece moved from the old Colorado History Museum to its new History Colorado Center location.
