= Amalia Mesa-Bains =

American artist (born 1943)

- Born: July 10, 1943 (age 83); Santa Clara, California
- Known for: Chicano art installations
- Awards: San Francisco Mission Cultural Center's Award of Honor; Association of American Cultures' Artist Award; Chicana Foundation of Northern California's Distinguished Working Women Award; San Francisco Mission Cultural Center's Award of Honor; Visionary Woman Award, Moore College of Art & Design; MacArthur Fellowship
- Website: Amaliamesabains.com

Amalia Mesa-Bains (born July 10, 1943), is a Chicana curator, author, visual artist, and educator. She is best known for her large-scale installations that reference home altars and ofrendas. Her work engages in a conceptual exploration of Mexican American women's spiritual practices that addresses colonial and imperial histories of display, the recovery of cultural memory, and their roles in identity formation.

In her writing, she examines the formation of Chicana identity and aesthetic practices, the shared experiences of historically marginalized communities in the United States, especially among women of color, and the role of multiculturalism within museums and cultural institutions. Her essay, "Domesticana: The Sensibility of Chicana Rasquache," theorized domesticana as a set of aesthetic strategies that use spaces and experiences historically associated with Mexican American women as sites for Chicana feminist reclamation.

== Biography ==
Mesa-Bains was born in Santa Clara, California. She received a B.A. in painting from San Jose State University before earning a M.A. in interdisciplinary education from San Francisco State University and a Ph.D. in clinical psychology from the Wright Institute in Berkeley, California. She then worked for the San Francisco Unified School District as a psychologist. She was the regional committee chair (Northern California) for the exhibition Chicano Art: Resistance and Affirmation. She has written Ceremony of Spirit: Nature and Memory in Contemporary Latino Art. Mesa-Bains lives in San Juan Bautista, California

== Career ==
Mesa-Bains worked as an educator for 20 years in the San Francisco Unified School District, where she served as an English as a Second Language teacher and a multicultural specialist. She also worked at the Far West Laboratory, where she performed case-based educational research. She co-wrote a casebook and teacher's guide entitled Diversity in the Classroom with Judith Shulman in 1993. As an artist, her works have been exhibited at the Smithsonian American Art Museum, the Whitney Museum of American Art, the San Francisco Museum of Modern Art, Williams College Museum of Art, the Queens Museum in New York, the Contemporary Exhibition Center of Lyon, France, the Kulturhuset in Stockholm, Sweden, the Museum of Modern Art in Dublin, Ireland, and the Culterforgenin in Copenhagen, Denmark.

== Awards ==
- In 1989 she received the San Francisco Mission Cultural Center's Award of Honor
- Association of American Cultures' Artist Award and the Chicana Foundation of Northern California's Distinguished Working Women Award in 1990
- INTAR-Hispanic Arts Center's Golden Palm Award in 1991
- MacArthur Fellowship award in 1992
- 1995 The Women's Caucus for Art confers on Mesa-Bains the honor Award for outstanding Achievement in the visual arts
- 2008 The College Art Association Committee on Women in the Arts awards the 13th annual recognition award to Mesa-Bains
- 2011 The council of 100 at the Fresno Art Museum honors Mesa-Bains with the Distinguished Woman Artist Award

== Exhibitions ==
Mesa-Bains's first exhibit was at the 1967 Phelan Awards show that took place in the Palace of the Legion of Honor in San Francisco. She began creating altar installations in 1975. Her artistic work is often autobiographical, relating to her Mexican Catholic heritage. Although these works take the form of an altar, they are not specifically intended for religious use. According to Kristin G. Congdon and Kara Kelley Hallmark, authors of Artists from Latin American Cultures: A Biographical Dictionary, "Mesa-Bains's altars often honor women who have broken social barriers." Using techniques related to found object art, Mesa-Bains has incorporated "dried leaves, rocks, pre-Columbian ceramic fragments" and other unusual materials to construct artworks such as her 1987 work Grotto of the Virgins, which is dedicated to painter Frida Kahlo (1907–1954), actress Dolores del Río (1905–1983), and to the artist's grandmother.

In 1990, Mesa-Bains was in The Decade Show, a multidisciplinary exhibition of the art and issues of the 1980s collaboratively organized by The New Museum, The Museum of Contemporary Hispanic Art, and The Studio Museum in Harlem and Including more than 100 artists. James Luna, Carmelita Tropicana, Betye Saar, and David Wojnarowicz were amongst the more than 100 artists included across multiple disciplines.

In 2023, BAMPFA held a retrospective exhibit of Amalia Mesa Bains's work entitled Archaeology of Memory. The exhibit covers fifty years of her cultural and artistic creation which includes books, paintings, home altars, offerings to the dead and home yard shrines. The collection of her works at this exhibit reflects her contributions to Chicanx/Latinx art. Mesa Bains displays objects from her family's history as the foundational materials to her style of art making. Her exhibit explores Chicanxs in U.S history, the role of women in Mexico, and spirituality. Amalia Mesa Bains Archaeology of Memory explores how important it is to remember family history because it is easily erased by patriarchal and Eurocentric culture. The exhibition Amalia Mesa-Bains: Archaeology of Memory features almost 60 pieces from throughout her career. The exhibition includes fourteen large installations and highlights Mesa-Bains's significant contributions to contemporary art. Her installations have expanded beyond domestic spaces to include laboratories, library forms, gardens, and landscapes, and they draw attention to the politics of space by highlighting the erasure of cultural differences in colonized Indigenous and Mexican American communities. Her works offer a feminist perspective on the domestic lives of immigrant and Mexican American women across various historical periods. The four-part installation series Venus Envy, which took several decades to create and is being displayed in its entirety for the first time at BAMPFA, is a notable example of this.

== Installations ==
Her installation, Ofrenda for Dolores Del Rio (1984, revised 1991), was collected by the Smithsonian American Art Museum as part of the exhibition Our America: The Latino Presence in American Art (2013), which highlights Latino Art contributions to American art history. This work pays homage to Dolores del Rio, who was often cast as an "exotic" woman. Amalia has remarked the 1991 revised version can be differentiated from the 1984 version by the addition of a picture of the artists' mother, Marina González Mesa, just to the right of the lower central picture of Dolores in the silver dress.

Queen of the waters, Mother of the Land of the Dead: Homenaje a Tonantzin/Guadalupe, 1992, fixed media installation including fabric drape, six jeweled clocks, mirror pedestals with grottos, nicho box, found objects, dried flowers, dried pomegranates and potpourri

Venus Envy Chapter 1: First Holy Communion, Moments Before the End, 1993/2022, Mixed media installation including fabric, photographs, clothing, found objects, mementos, mirrors, furniture, San Francisco Museum of Modern Art.

The Library of Sor Juana Ines de la Cruz, 1994/2021, in Venus Envy Chapter 2: The Harem and other Enclosures Multimedia installation with Chairs, mirrors, artist books, and photographs.

The Virgins Garden 1994/2022, in Venus Envy Chapter 2: The Harem and Other Enclosures, Mixed Media installation including mirrors, moss, hand-painted armoire, handmade book with painted images, clothing, and found objects.

Venus Envy Chapter ll: The Harem and Other Enclosures, 1994 Mixed Media Installation including mirrors, colored scarves, and handmade book with painted images.

Circle of Ancestors, 1995 Mixed Media Installation including candles and seven hand painted chairs with mirrors and jewels.

Vestment of Copper in Venus Envy Chapter lll: Cihuatlampa, the Place of the Giant Women, 1997 Copper and wire mesh, jewels and painted faux branches.

Vestment of Feathers in Venus Envy Chapter lll: Cihuatlampa, the Place of the Giant Women, 1997 Feathered cape.

Cihuateotl with Mirror in Private Landscapes and Public Territories, 2018. Mixed media installation including mirrors, woven rug, and moss-covered Styrofoam Figure.

Private Landscapes and Public Territories, 1996-2011/2018 Mixed media installation including hand painted and mirrored armoire, found objects, moss, dried flowers, faux topiaries, family photos, miniature jeweled trees, and painted wooden hedges.

Transparent Migrations, 2001 Mixed media installation including mirrored armoire, sixteen glass leaves, wired armatures, small gauze dress, lace mantilla, assorted crystal miniatures and shattered safety glass.

What the River Gave to Me, 2002 Mixed media installation including hand carved and painted sculptured landscaped, LED lighting, crushed glass, hand blown and engraved glass rocks, and candles.

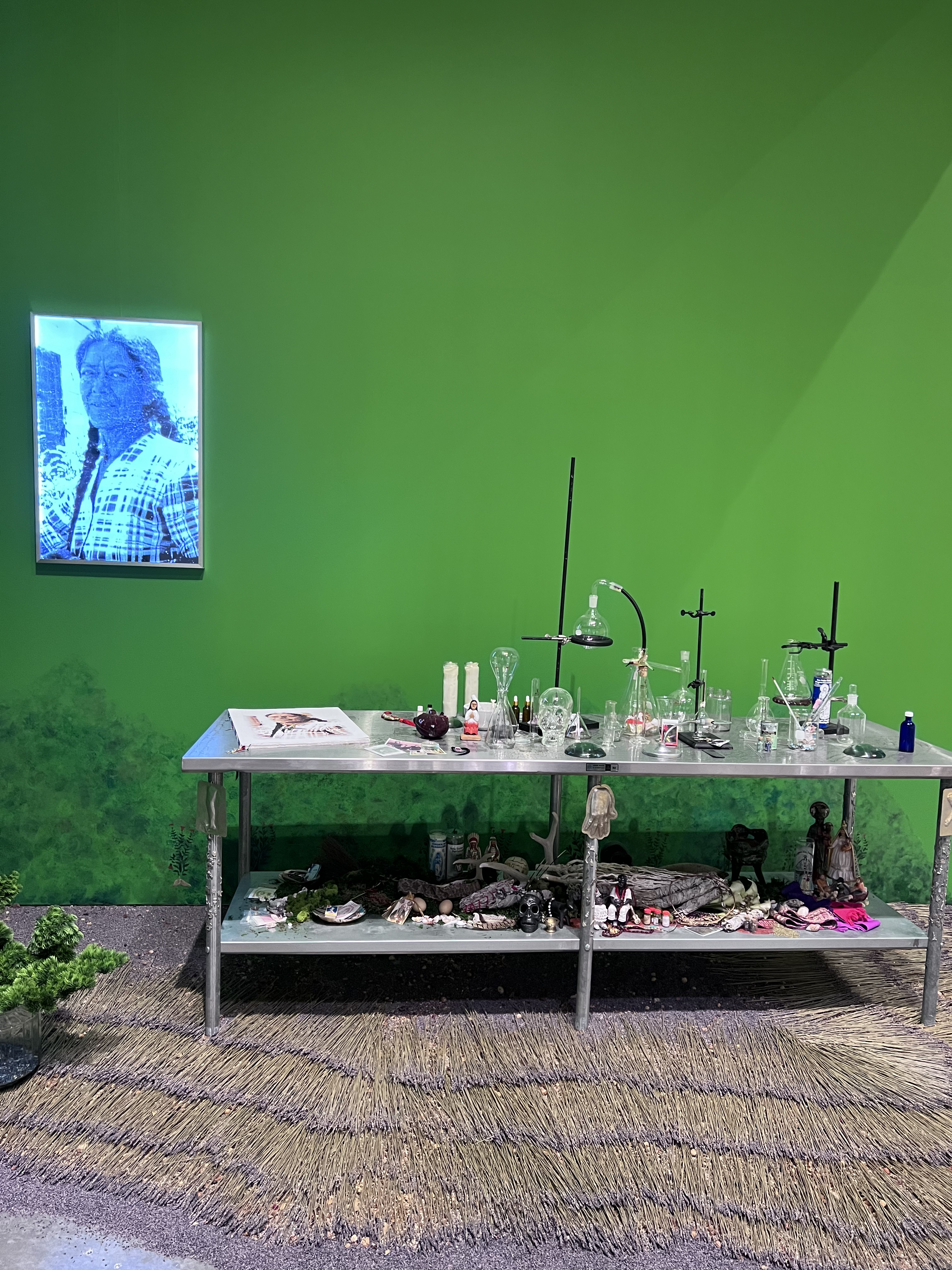
Art Installation

Venus Envy Chapters lV: The Road to Paris and its Aftermath, The Curanderas Botanica, 2008/2023 Mixed media installation including medicine cabinet, two-tiered metal table, family mementos, perfume bottle, ex-voto on tin, photographs, light box, chemistry beakers, hand printed book, found objects, dried plants, rattlesnake skin, candles, dried lavender, oil painting, glass jars, and faux pine branches.

== Books ==
- Ceremony Of Memory: Contemporary Hispanic Spiritual and Ceremonial Art. Santa Fe. NM: Center for Contemporary Art, 1988
- Homegrown: Engaged Cultural Criticism. Co-authored with bell hooks. Cambridge, MA: South End Press, 2006.
- Homegrown: Engaged Cultural Criticism. New 1st edition. Co-authored with bell hooks. New York and London: Routledge
- Venus Envy: Chapters l-lV. Amalia Mesa-Bains. Mendicino, CA: Moving Parts Pres, 2022. Introduction by Jennifer A. Gonzalez. Bookwork by Felicia Rice Paperback accordion book.
