= Victor Ochoa =

Mexican-American artist

Victor Orozco Ochoa
- Born: August 2, 1948 (age 77); Los Angeles
- Education: San Diego State University
- Notable work: Chicano Park Murals
- Children: 2

Victor Ochoa (born August 2, 1948) is an activist, painter, graphic designer and master muralist. He has painted over 100 murals, many of them in San Diego, California. He is considered one of the pioneers of San Diego's Chicano art movement. Ochoa was one of the original activists at Chicano Park and a co-founder of Centro Cultural de la Raza in Balboa Park, both in San Diego. He helped establish the influential Border Art Workshop/Taller de Arte Fronteriza (BAW/TAF). Ochoa is also a teacher of art and Chicano heritage. His work has been shown nationally and internationally, including at the Venice Bi-Annual, at the Museum of Contemporary Art, San Diego and in the groundbreaking exhibition, Chicano Art: Resistance and Affirmation (CARA). In addition to creating his own work, he is also a master of art preservation techniques, especially relating to murals. He is considered to be a "serious cultural resource in the border region.

== Biography ==
Ochoa's family has a long history of activism and struggling against discrimination. Ochoa was born in South Central Los Angeles and later his family moved to East Los Angeles. When Ochoa was seven, his family was removed from Los Angeles by United States Immigration as part of "Operation Wetback." Ochoa lived in Tijuana for about ten years and spent time working with his family in a carpentry factory when he was old enough to help. Later his family was able to return to Los Angeles. Ochoa felt that living in Mexico gave him a new perspective on "racism and discrimination, and the general attitude about Mexicans" in the United States.

Ochoa always enjoyed school and felt he was a good student. At junior high, an incident happened that deeply affected Ochoa. He was trying to help another student who only spoke Spanish. The school had a policy against speaking Spanish and when a teacher heard Ochoa using that language, he was incensed and began to criticize the Spanish language and insulting Mexicans, according to Ochoa. Ochoa was shocked by the teacher's display of racism. He hit the teacher and was taken to the principal's office, though he wasn't punished as he expected. Instead, the incident led to Ochoa and the principal becoming friends later on in life.

Ochoa graduated from high school in 1967 and moved to San Diego, California. In San Diego, he attended City College and received an associate degree in technical illustration. Afterwards, he attended San Diego State and graduated with a BA in 1974.

Ochoa became involved with Chicano activism while he was in college. In April 1970, he saw fliers at the City College Student Center for a park take-over for what would later become Chicano Park. Ochoa recalls leaving class to go to the protest. He and other artists added their own stamp to the protest by starting murals on the park. Along with Guillermo Aranda, Mario Acevedo, Tomas Casteneda, Salvatore Borjas, Ochoa began painting the retaining walls and pylons near Logan Avenue, claiming the park for the neighborhood. As the park was recognized by the city, Ochoa continued to help improve the art and the organization of Chicano Park. He later became part of the steering Committee for Chicano Park. Ochoa has continued to be involved with the park and its restoration, including writing a manual for how to restore the murals.

Ochoa was part of the founding group of the Centro Cultural de la Raza called Tolecas en Aztlán. to. As controversy surrounding the creation of the Centro in Balboa Park escalated, Ochoa became a key negotiator during the protests. Later, he served as a director for the Centro from 1970 to 1973 and again from 1988 to 1990.

Ochoa has been teaching in many different capacities throughout the years. He states that he never wanted to be a full time teacher, but when his son was born, he was wanted to ensure that he had a steady income. Ochoa has taught at the MAAC Community Charter school for 13 years and retired in 2014. He taught at Grossmont College for about 23 years. Ochoa also taught at UCSD and San Diego Mesa College. Many of his teaching jobs had a community function, like when he worked with youth to create murals with a grant from the Jacobs Foundation in the Diamond Neighborhoods located in southeastern San Diego. Ochoa and other artists would bring free paint and work on the area surrounding Chollas Creek. The program was named Graff Creek. His teaching youth how to paint decreased the amount of graffiti the neighborhood received. He worked as an art consultant for the Jacobs Foundation for 11 years. He has since retired from formal teaching, but plans to continue to paint and work with children's art classes and workshops.

He has a son, Victor and a daughter, Xochitl.

== Art ==
Ochoa has always felt that public art, like murals, is a very important teaching tool for members of his community. He believes that since many Chicanos do not visit galleries or museums and instead learn about history and other ideas through public art. His murals depict pre-Columbian culture, Mexican heroes and subjects he chooses to "raise social consciousness" in his viewers. Ochoa feels that communicating Chicano history through murals and other types of art is one of the most powerful and trustworthy sources of information about the movement.

== Book ==
Ochoa, Victor (2006). Chicano Park Mural Restoration Technical Manual. San Diego, California: Cal Trans District 11 and the Chicano Park Steering Committee.

== Quotes ==
"Art is part of the solution of issues in society and Chicano art has been the expression of our people's struggle."
