= Malaquías Montoya =

Chicano Artist (born 1938)

- Born: 1938 (age 87–88); Albuquerque, New Mexico, U.S.
- Education: University of California, Berkeley
- Known for: drawing, painting, murals and silkscreen
- Awards: Adaline Kent Award from the San Francisco Art Institute (1997) Special Congressional Recognition, Awarded by Congressman Mike Thompson in recognition of outstanding and invaluable service to the community, Woodland, California (2005)

Malaquías Montoya (born 1938) is an American-born Chicano poster artist, painter, and muralist, who is a major figure in the Chicano Art Movement that began the 1960s and 1970s. He cofounded the Mexican American Liberation Art Front (known as Male Efe in 1968. He was also an early member of the Rebel Chicano Art Front, which evolved into the Royal Chicano Air Force, one of the most important Chicano art groups, active in the San Francisco Bay area. His primary artistic themes are said to be injustice, empowerment, and international struggle.

== Early life and education ==
Montoya was born in Albuquerque, New Mexico. He was raised by a single mother in a family of migrant farm workers (including his future artist brother, José Montoya) in California's Central Valley. Neither of his parents were literate, and his three eldest siblings did not progress beyond the seventh grade. This experience motivated him to become an educator.

Montoya joined the U.S. Marines. He was able to attend the University of California at Berkeley through the G.I. Bill. He learned the art of silkscreening while working for a commercial printer.

== Career ==
=== Teaching ===
Montoya has taught at UC Berkeley, Stanford University, California College of Arts and Crafts, University of Notre Dame, and University of Texas, San Antonio. He was a full professor at the University of California, Davis where he began teaching in 1989. He is Professor Emeritus of Chicana/o Studies at the University of California, Davis.

Montoya is a co-founder with Carlos Francisco Jackson of Taller Arte de Nuevo Amanecer (TANA), a print studio, exhibition and teaching space in Woodland, California. TANA is in partnership with the UC Davis Chicana/o Studies program.

=== Work ===
Philosophically, Montoya is an anti-commercial, popular artist: "Malaquias Montoya has chosen not to devote his artistic creations to the commerical gallery world.... he believes that art should be directed to the broadest possible audiences, including those who do not frequent commercial galleries. Montoya has elected to make the world his art gallery. In so doing, he is following a long tradition of cultural theoreticians who have deconstructed the negative social and cultural dimensions of artistic theories opposed to popular diffusion of the arts."

Montoya explained the goals of his work in an artist's statement: "I pay homage to the workers and I aggrandize their efforts. I celebrate small and large victories of the human spirit. I depict people in control of their lives working together to change and transform their reality. As Bertolt Brecht said: 'Art should not be a mirror of reality but a hammer with which to shape a new reality.'"

Montoya gained prominence for his silkscreen printed posters that address social justice issues. During the 1960s and 70s, a period when printmaking became a favored medium for activist artists, it facilitated more accessible, affordable, and efficient poster production. Thus, he is known for incorporating social justice themes in his work including immigration, the Zapatista movement, and Palestine. His art is evidence of social justice themes that expose the realities of marginalized communities that can make people uncomfortable.

In an offset lithograph from 1972 called Julio 26 - Cuba Vietnam y Nosotros Venceremos, Montoya put Chicano struggle in a global context. He "weds imagery of the Cuban Revolution and Vietnam with the Chicano struggle at home by adding the word nosotros, or 'us,' to the text. The phrase 'Julio 26' (July 26) references Fidel Castro’s successful guerilla movement that toppled the military dictatorship of Cuban president Fulgencio Batista in 1959."

In 2006 he completed a series of paintings and screenprints on the death penalty which referenced those killed by the death penalty including Ethel and Julius Rosenberg and Jesus Christ.

Montoya has produced substantial work on the issue of immigration. He produced the print Immigrant’s Dream (2004) which shows a faceless figure covered completely in the American flag which serves as a bag with a tag labeled “undocumented.” This print presented the horrific reality of what becomes of the coveted American Dream. Another print titled, Undocumented includes a man trapped in barbed wire with the word undocumented written in red with blood dripping across his body. The barbed wire is representative of the physical barrier of the US-Mexico Border that migrants encounter when crossing the border. In addition, the captivity of the man within the barbed wire is metaphorical for the emotional suffering due to migration. The Smithsonian American Art Museum gives this analysis: "Montoya’s faceless and bleeding brown figure is caught within the spikes of barbed wire and assumes the posture of the crucified Christ, while also evoking the central victim in Francisco de Goya’s Third of May 1808 in Madrid (1814). These references humanize the plight of undocumented immigrants in the 1980s, many of whom were fleeing civil wars in Central America that had intensified with U.S. intervention. Montoya created this print during his years of activism leading up to the passage of the U.S. Immigration Reform and Control Act of 1986, which secured various forms of temporary legal status for undocumented people."

In a screen print from 2000 called Un Besito Para Siempre (A little kiss for forever), a skeletal couple are about to kiss, while the male presents the female with a rose. The artist describes the work this way: “This print is of two farm workers, husband and wife, coming to the end of their lives. They ask each other for a kiss that will last forever.” Additional imagery references Zapata and the United Farm Workers.

One of his prints from 2018 treats Miranda Rights: the right to remain silent.

In 2023 he created a sizable mural at the UC Davis Student Community Center. Montoya holds the view that the artist's role in the community remains unchanged despite technological advancements and the prevalence of social media. He asserts, "I perceive their role to be constant; the artist's task is to articulate the issues presented to us in a convoluted manner, enabling people to comprehend the role they need to fulfill. I believe the cultural worker's responsibility is to interpret information from those in power and present it back to the community in a clearer form."

== Solo exhibitions ==
Jan Shrem and Maria Manetti Shrem Museum of Art opened the retrospective Malaquias Montoya and the Legacies of a Printed Resistance. The exhibition was curated by Claudia Zapata, guest curator and it will be on view from October 1, 2023, to May 6, 2024. Yo Soy Chicano is part of an homage to Malaquías Montoya and the legacy he has shaped. The current exhibitions primarily feature prints and posters, but a significant aspect of his influence stems from murals produced in collaboration with the UC Davis mural class. When questioned about having gallery representation, Montoya replied, "My gallery extends from Lake Merritt to 87th Street (in Oakland). You can encounter my creations on utility poles and building facades. The intention was for people to encounter my work as they drive through the neighborhood or stroll to the grocery store".

The Oakland Museum of California (OMCA) also honors Malaquías Montoya by exhibiting, Por el Pueblo: The Legacy and Influence of Malaquías Montoya, which will be on view from October 6, 2023, to June 30, 2024. Por el Pueblo acknowledges Malaquías Montoya's role as a founding figure and leader within the Chicano Arts Movement, examining how his impact persists through present-day activist artists. Similar to Montoya in his early years, contemporary artists still face marginalization from the mainstream due to their identities and their commitment to speaking truth to power. Beyond highlighting Montoya's work and ongoing influence, Por el Pueblo underscores the efforts of current artists who are amplifying the voices of marginalized communities, with a particular focus on queer individuals and Chicanas.

== Awards ==
Adaline Kent Award from the San Francisco Art Institute (1997)

Art as a Hammer Honor, Center for the Study of Political Graphics, Los Angeles, CA (1997)

Special Congressional Recognition, Awarded by Congressman Mike Thompson in recognition of outstanding and invaluable service to the community, Woodland, California (2005)

== Publications ==
Montoya, Malaquias, Lisa Rico, and Vacaville Museum. (2019). Women I Have Encountered : Works by Malaquias Montoya. [Vacaville, Calif.]: Vacaville Museum.

Montoya, Malaquias and Lezlie Salkowitz-Montoya. (2004). Premeditated: Meditations on Capital Punishment : Recent Works by Malaquias Montoya. Notre Dame: Institute for Latino Studies, University of Notre Dame.

Montoya, Malaquias, and Lezlie Salkowitz-Montoya. (2008). Globalization and War: The Aftermath: Works by Malaquias Montoya. Elmira, Calif.: University of California, Irvine.

Montoya, Malaquias, and San Francisco Art Institute. (1997). Malaquias Montoya: June 5-July 13, 1997, Adaline Kent Award Exhibition, San Francisco Art Institute, Walter/McBean Gallery. San Francisco. Calif.: The Institute.

Romo, Terecita, and Malaquias Montoya. (2011). Malaquias Montoya. Los Angeles: UCLA Chicano Studies Research Center Press).

Romo, Terezita. (2009). Malaquias Montoya. University of Minnesota Press, MN. ISBN 978-0-89551-106-5 (Second Place - Best Arts Book, 2012 International Latino Book Awards)

Zirker, Joseph, and M Street Graduate Studios (California State University, Fresno). (2019). Malaquias Montoya : A Voice for the Voiceless. Edited by Cindy Urrutia. Fresno, CA: The Press at California State University, Fresno.

== Activism ==
Montoya’s activism was shaped by his exposure to the Chicano movement which incorporated ideals of resistance and cultural affirmation. This movement had an emphasis on civil rights for Mexican Americans and raising political, economic, and social consciousness. He became part of the Mexican American Student Confederation (MASC) and produced leaflets and posters to empower the community and raise awareness about the cause. He demonstrated solidarity with fellow activists by distributing UFW buttons and bumper stickers. Moreover, he participated in MASC sit ins which were organized to demand University of California, Berkeley to include a Mexican American Studies course of study and requested that the administration demonstrate solidarity with the UFW’s grape boycott.

At Berkeley, Montoya was actively involved with advocacy organizations by contributing art to their mobilization efforts. He continued his poster making collaboration with the UFW in Berkeley. One of his famous works for the UFW was the poster with a central message of “Support the Farmworkers War” asking for donations of food and clothing. The color palette includes bold colors such as red, black, and yellow and bold lettering with the intention of demanding attention to support the labor movement which is referred to as a war effort. The inverted Aztec eagle (UFW logo) is covering three faceless and barely identifiable figures. In his UFW poster, he represented the farmworker families as advocating for their rights to frame the discourse on the struggle of marginalized communities. Montoya was also linked to the Third World Liberation Front (TWLF) advocacy efforts seeking to establish a separate Third World College that would enhance representation for minorities including African Americans, Chicanos, Asians, and Native Americans. His involvement in the TWLF provided an invaluable perspective on mobilization such as learning about “coalition politics” which conveyed that collaboration between groups with overlapping interests could be a powerful force to enact change. There was an emphasis on the shared struggle which he sought to include in his posters of mobilization. In this wide array of posters, he used the terms “Huelga” (strike) to emphasize the resistance and would use "Unidos" to suggest a form of solidarity between various disenfranchised groups. In addition, his TWLF posters include faceless or unrecognizable figures to suggest that this is a collective fight against power. His time at Berkeley shaped him as an artist as he began to merge politics with aesthetics with the intention of participating in activism at the local and international level.

In 1968, Montoya founded the Mexican-American Liberation Art Front and was "arguably the most influential Chicano artist collective in the movement".

== Personal life ==
Montoya lives with his wife, Lezlie Salkowitz-Montoya, in Solano County, Northern California.
