= Rubén Trejo =

American sculptor and painter (1937–2009)

Rubén Trejo (January 7, 1937 – July 19, 2009) was an American sculptor and painter who served as a professor at Eastern Washington University.

Trejo's work addresses issues within the Chicano and Latino community, but also discusses culture, race, history, and faith. His work is part of the permanent collections at the National Museum of Mexican Art in Chicago, the Smithsonian American Art Museum, and the National Hispanic Cultural Center in Albuquerque, New Mexico.

== Personal life ==
Trejo was born in 1937 in St. Paul, Minnesota in a CB&Q boxcar. His parents were Tarascan indigenous people from Michoacan, Mexico who came to the United States in the 1910s or 20s to do railroad work. Trejo had 11 siblings, four of whom died soon after birth. His mother never learned English, so he spoke Spanish at home and English in school.

As a child, Trejo traveled around the country performing migrant farm work with his siblings until the early 1950s. In Minnesota and Indiana they picked potatoes, onions, and sugar beets and tomatoes. The family lived in a primarily white communities; in Trejo and his siblings were often the only Mexican Americans in their classes and often felt left out by their classmates. According to Trejo. he looked self-identification through other sources, especially art.

Trejo earned his M.F.A. in sculpture from the University of Minnesota in 1969. He also earned a minor in Latin American Literature. His art professors often suggested he look to the white artists for inspiration, but he instead went artists and writers such as Octavio Paz and Guillermo Gómez-Pena.

== Career as an educator ==
Trejo taught art at the College of Saint Teresa, Winona, Minnesota in the early 70's, married Joanne, a former nun, and had three children, the first, a son named Eugenio Trejo in Winona and twin sisters who were born in Spokane . The family moved to Spokane, Washington in 1973 when he was 36 to teach Art Humanities (Western Civilization) and Drawing at Eastern Washington University (EWU). He later taught sculpture and later Mexican art.

Upon arriving at EWU, Trejo led a week long student sit-in at the President's office in support of Latino students. An advocate for Latino and Chicano students, he frequently welcomed them to his home and studio.

In 1977, Trejo co-founded the Chicano Education Program at EWU. This program promotes the career and higher education opportunities for Latino students and educates the general public on Latino heritage and the Chicano Movement. He was awarded the EWU Trustee Medal in 1987. Trejo also has a named scholarship; the Ruben Trejo Hispanic Scholarship for a Latino or Chicano student pursuing an undergraduate degree in art. In addition to this, in 2024, the Spokane Public Language Immersion Program changed their name to Rubén Trejo Dual Language Academy, in honor of this local legend.

== Career as an artist ==
Trejo's move to Washington helped his identity flourish and transform as he became more involved the Chicano Movement and Latino issues. To him, Chicano meant the mixing of Mexican and United States culture.

On one occasion, Trejo was invited to meet the first ladies of Mexico and the US at the Art Institute in Chicago. Trejo looked at it as an "opportunity to bring cultures together, acknowledging the fact that many of the immigrants in this country are Mexicans, and they come here to contribute in diverse ways. It's not just about cheap labor, but about generations that have redefined American culture."

Ben Mitchell, senior curator of art at the Northwest Museum of Arts and Culture, says that Trejo was included in virtually every major Hispanic or Chicano art exhibition in the past 25 years. According to Mitchell, Trejo "was absolutely unafraid of any medium...[he worked with] brushed aluminum, paper collages, welded constructions, bent railroad spikes, and bronze-cast underpants".

As a Tarascan, Trejo was inspired by his pre-Columbian heritage. His artwork is said to reflect this aspect of his life and connect to his identity as an American. He painted a mural in his kitchen displaying his love for Mexican folklore and history. "Parts of the mural were taken from Paradise of Tlaloc (the water god), one of the first murals in Teotihuacan, but Ruben – in typical fashion – updated it with images from popular culture and personal references to his family".

Trejo's piece Mandalas uses railroad spikes in remembrance of his father's time working on railroads. His artwork also uses objects such as farm tools, chili peppers, and sweet potatoes. He wants to make his work accessible and recognizable to everyone, so he tends to put shapes and objects in his work that everyone can identify with.

Trejo used underwear and a jalapeño, in his Calzones series, one of his more political works. The bronzed underwear and jalapeño are meant to challenge the Spanish machismo culture. Also a part of this series is Alacrán, a piece that recreates underwear to be a mask. It is meant to represent the masks that people wear, both literally and figuratively, during Halloween and the Day of the Dead, and is meant to highlight the mixing of Latino and United States culture as well.
