= Ricardo Valverde =

Ricardo Valverde (1946–1998) was a Chicano documentary photographer based in East Los Angeles, California.

== Biography ==
Ricardo Valverde was born in Phoenix, Arizona in 1946 and at the age of twelve or thirteen his family moved to South Los Angeles. Valverde was one of eleven children, his parents both worked. He enlisted in the Air Force during the Vietnam War and served for four years, stationed in Seattle and California. During his time in the military, he became the editor of the base's newspaper, Vapor Tales, where he took photographs of women officers and others. While living in Oxnard in the late 1960s, he met his wife, Espie Chavez, and were married after two years of dating. In 1984, Valverde was diagnosed with a brain tumor which would eventually take his life in 1998.

== Education ==
Valverde's earlier education was at Cathedral High School, an all-boys Catholic school near Downtown Los Angeles. After graduating in 1964 he enrolled in Los Angeles City College (LACC) where he pursued art classes and even took fashion classes. His career at LACC did not last long, after only one semester, he enrolled in Los Angeles Trade–Technical College to study fashion. His schooling was interrupted by the Vietnam War. After he finished his military service, he enrolled once again this time at California State University, Los Angeles where he decided to study documentary photography. He only attended one semester, then transferred to the University of California, Los Angeles (UCLA), where he took more photography classes and majored in art history. He also received his MFA at UCLA in 1976.

== Artworks ==
Valverde started photographing in the year 1970 when he was employed by the Department of Water and Power where he would visit numerous neighborhoods. This is where he started his street photography such as his work shoppers on Broadway, 1977, which depicts two women in the foreground who could have been mother and daughter in front of a bookstore strolling by. Valverde was inspired by the great documentary photographers, namely Edward Weston, Brassaï, and Manuel Álvarez Bravo. His work also included several portraits of his wife, Esperanza and Jude, 1974, some, where she was nude beside their son, to him this was a family portrait. He would attend community events in East Los Angeles and document the individuals there, one of his photographs from a car show Whitter Boulevard, 1979 depicts a young woman standing beside a lowrider who is a member of the lowrider subculture. Graffiti was another aspect of his photography, an example of his graffiti photography is graffiti in Los Angeles, 1978, where a young woman is standing in front of a white wall that is covered in graffiti art. Not all his work was documentary, he also had some experimental photography that was mixed media or staged personas in front of a camera. He would paint on some of his photographs and sometimes scratch them to reach a different look such as his work Manitas, 1993 where there are hands scratching a wall and he added red paint and literal scratches to the print. Although his work seems to be documentary-heavy, it is also very experimental.

== Exhibitions ==
=== Solo exhibitions ===
1994 Versins and Diversions (Versiones y Diversiones), LA Artcore Center, Los Angeles, California

1985 Solo exhibition, Pima Community College, Tucson, Arizona

1989 Dia de los Muertos, Sonrisa Gallery, Los Angeles

=== Group exhibitions ===
1975 Chicanarte, Municipal Art Gallery, Los Angeles and La Familia, Ojo Music Center, Los Angeles

== Awards ==
Juried prize for exhibition, Mexican-American Photography, Archive General de la Nacion, Mexico City, Mexico, 1988.

== Bibliography ==
- FOSTER, D. (2017). BARRIO LIVES: Ricardo Valverde's East Los Angeles Photography. In Picturing the Barrio: Ten Chicano Photographers (pp. 15–28). Pittsburgh, Pa.: University of Pittsburgh Press. doi:10.2307/j.ctt1pwtcjz.4
- Fajardo-Hill, Cecilia (June 2014). Experimental Sights, 1971–1996. UCLA Chicano Studies Research Center. Retrieved April 2021. https://www.chicano.ucla.edu/files/Valverde_catalog.pdf
- García, Ramón. Ricardo Valverde. Los Angeles: UCLA Chicano Studies Research Center, 2013. Print. A Ver—revisioning Art History; 8.
- Valverde, Ricardo. Accessed April 2021. http://www.ricardovalverde.com
