= Louis Carlos Bernal =

American photographer (1941–1993)

Louis Carlos Bernal (August 18, 1941 – August 18, 1993) was a Chicano-American photographer. His works focused on social expression and developing a visual narrative, especially during the time of the Chicano Movement. This movement advocated for cultural pride, social justice, and civil rights for Mexican Americans.

== Early life and education ==
Born in Douglas, Arizona, Bernal "grew up very aware of his identity and formed an interest in social justice and Chicanx pride" because of the racism that he had to face. After coming to a realization that he had a passion for photography, Bernal attended Arizona State University, where he earned his Masters of Fine Art degree. Afterwards, in 1977, he was offered a position to teach at Pima Community College in Tucson, where he continued to teach throughout the duration of his life while doing his own work.

== Career ==
Despite having had artistic success, Bernal struggled financially throughout his career. His breakthrough happened in 1977 when he created the Benitez Suite and participated in Espejo: Reflections of the Mexican American, a touring show that allowed him to develop new techniques.

Bernal's works grew from simply wanting to embrace his identity, to delving deeper into Chicano culture and community. He was considered to be the father of Chicano photography, because he was one of the first to approach his work as both a Chicano and an artist. Bernal's works and narratives centered on capturing people in their most intimate and humble surroundings.Furthermore, his works contributed heavily to the Chicano Movement in the 1960s and 1970s. One of his most popular series, Barrios, encapsulates the different aspects that comprise Chicanx identity. These were taken in the Southwest, and contains 30 photographs.

== Style and themes ==
Bernal's work include themes of identity, home, community and belonging, a different representation of the traditional view of the U.S.–Mexico border way of living. Specifically, Bernal's photographs focused on depicting Mexican American subjects within domestic interiors, emphasizing the role of these spaces in representing cultural identity and belonging within their communities. The collaborative book Louis Carlos Bernal: Barrios comprises both essays from people who knew Bernal personally and some of his photographs and series. Each essay mentions how Bernal put his emotions into his photos, as a way to emphasize the importance of the community ones grows up in, and the inability for a person to isolate themself from their upraising.

Rather than being viewed as a documentation of the Chicanx lifestyle, the photos opened up the concept of interpretation. When looking at Chicanx art overall, it is possible for different interpretations to arise when looking at Bernal's style in comparison to the arts of social movements, protests, and politics.

== Notable work ==
Some of Louis Carlos Bernal notable work include the photograph Dos Cholas, Tucson, Arizona (1982), which depicts two women at a social gathering against a car on the outskirts of Tucson. The photograph represents the lives and experiences of the Mexican American working class.

Another work includes, Juanita Serrano with Santo Niño de Atocha (1978), it shows a women standing beside an altar filled with religious imagery and elements. This work reflects the role of Catholic traditions in Mexican American communities, specifically in their domestic space.

== Online collections and archives ==
Bernal's works and collections are held in various institutions, including the Center for Creative Photography at the University of Arizona and the San Francisco Museum of Modern Art (SFMOMA)

== Legacy ==
At the age of 48, Bernal was involved in a bicycle–car accident that left him in a coma and eventually led to his death in Tucson, Arizona, on August 18, 1993.However, his legacy will be remembered by creating on of the first large scope photographic records of Mexican American life in Southwest during the 1970's and 1980s.

== Bibliography ==
- "Bernal, Louis Carlos." SFMOMA, www.sfmoma.org/artist/Louis_Carlos_Bernal/.
- Coffey, Charlie P (2021). Louis Carlos Bernal's Barrios: The Politics of Domesticity in the Wake of the Chicano Movement (Thesis). ProQuest 2521644226.
- Ferrer, Elizabeth. Latinx Photography in the United States : A Visual History. Seattle, University Of Washington Press, 2020.
- "Louis Carlos Bernal." Center for Creative Photography, 20 Nov. 2019, ccp.Arizona.edu/artists/louis-carlos-bernal
- Simmons-Myers, Ann. "Louis Carlos Bernal: Barrios." Pima Community College, in association with the University of Arizona Library, 2002.
