= Cecilia Alvarez =

American painter

Cecilia Concepción Alvarez
- Born: April 15, 1950 (age 75); San Diego, California
- Known for: Chicana Art
- Notable work: Las Cuatas Diego, 1979* La Tierra Santa, 1983* Si Te Puede Pasar a Ti, 1992
- Style: Her oil paintings and murals depict themes of feminism, poverty, and environmental degradation in the United States and Latin America.
- Website: www.ceciliaalvarez.com

Cecilia Alvarez (born April 15, 1950) is an American Chicana artist known for her oil paintings and murals depicting themes of feminism, poverty, and environmental degradation in the United States and Latin America. Alvarez's painting Las Cuatas Diego has been featured in books and exhibitions around the world. Alvarez has also illustrated the bilingual children's book Antonio's Card authored by Rigoberto González. Her work is collected by the Mexican Fine Arts Museum, the Seattle Art Museum and by the Kaiser Foundation.

== Biography ==
Alvarez was born in National City, California, to a Cuban father and a Mexican mother. She was raised by both of her parents in San Diego, California and Tijuana, Mexico. Her art draws inspiration from her diverse upbringing within a variety of cultural and political settings.

Alvarez is a self-taught artist. Alvarez started studying at San Diego State University, however, she did not complete her education because she felt that it wasn't necessary. She had been told by faculty that because she was a Mexican-American woman, her work would never be considered "fine art." Alvarez began to help her family financially at the age of twenty-three, after leaving college.

In 1975 Alvarez moved to Washington state where she has created the majority of her artwork.

From 1978 to 1981, she attended Eastern Washington University.

She currently resides and works in Seattle, Washington with her husband and two children.

== Art ==
Alvarez is primarily a painter, but she has worked on large public artwork and on helping youth to create murals to raise cultural awareness. Alvarez uses personal imagery in her art in order to critique issues that are politically and culturally important to her. She has stated that she hopes to "create discourse through her art, on issues of entitlement, poverty and who is expendable in our collective." Alvarez attempts to redefine the cultural values assigned to women and the concept of family using her art. Her duality as a woman and Chicana define her art as she states, "how we fit into the universe, telling jokes, music, laying tile, whatever it was that evolved that whole ability to think of our humanity." The recurring use of female images in her work relates to the artists close relationship wither her mother and her aunt, both of whom bestowed upon her the values of family and human connection.

Through her art, she hopes to spark dialogue on the societal importance placed on notions like beauty and power. In 1991, Alvarez gifted a color print of her painting "Las Cuatas Diego" to The Mexican Museum's permanent collection located in San Francisco.

In 1994, Alvarez was commissioned by the Washington State Arts Commission for a large public art project where she designed and created art and architectural elements in the Student Activities Center at Seattle Central College. She worked closely with the building's architects. These elements are etched windows, sandblasted concrete patterns, ceramic tiles, and exterior cladding. She noted, “The intent of these patterns was not only to pay homage to the cultures represented, but to attempt to infuse the structures and the site with a sense of belonging and intimacy.”

She created the illustrations for the children's book Antonio's Card written by Rigoberto Gonzalez published in 2005.

== Notable works ==
- Las Cuatas Diego, 1979
- La Tierra Santa, 1983
- Si Te Puede Pasar a Ti, 1992

== Selected group exhibitions ==
- 2016 Beyond Aztlán: Mexican and Chicana/o Artists in the Pacific Northwest, Museum of Northwest Art (MONA).
