= Lorraine Garcia-Nakata =

American artist (born 1950)

Lorraine Garcia-Nakata (born 1950) is an American artist who works with various mediums including pastel, charcoal, ceramics, printmaking, installation, sculpture, and paint. Her work surrounds themes of the daily life, portraiture, and realism and is known for her large scale artworks. She is a member of the Royal Chicano Air Force (RCAF) artist collective since 1974.

== Early life and education ==
Garcia-Nakata was born in Yuba City, California as the third generation in her family to reside in the United States. Her maternal grandparents Basilio Prado and Juanita Montes Muños, came to the United States in 1914, during the Mexican Revolution. Lorraine grew up in the Central Valley and identifies as Chicana. Lorraine lived in Oroville, California before moving to Olivehurst, California.

== Major artworks ==
=== Southside Park Mural, 1977 ===
The multi panel mural project in Sacramento, California was restored in 2001 by the RCAF group, including Garcia-Nakata who designed, outlined, and painted Indigenous women with their hands open. These murals provide a culturally appropriate setting for community events such as Cinco de Mayo, Dia de Los Muertos, or the Barrio Olympics. Each panel has its own distinctive artistic style and make references to pre-Columbian, Neo-Amerindian, and Chicanx youth iconography.

=== Friends, No Matter What, 2008 ===
This artwork medium is charcoal and pastel on paper and was exhibited online at the Museo Eduardo Carrillo website. It represents the artist herself and her African American friend playing hide and seek, while standing back to back and blindfolded. It references the racial tension that has existed throughout American culture and personal experiences of the artists.

== Publications ==
- Chola Enterprises, 2015
- Children’s Stories for Adults: from the I Can Eat Fire Writings, 2018
- Illuminations: Day of the Dead Indigenous and Colonial Expressions, 2004
- Mexican Museum/La Casa Futura, Lorraine García-Nakata, 1998

== Awards ==
- 2003, California Arts Council, Visual Arts Fellowship Award, Printmaking

== Bibliography ==
- Diaz, Ella Maria. “Flying Under the Radar with the Royal Chicano Air Force Mapping a Chicano/a Art History By Ella Maria Diaz.” The University of Texas Press, 15 Mar. 2019, utpress.utexas.edu/books/diaz-flying-under-the-radar-with-royal-chicano-air-force.
- Keller, Gary D., and Amy K. Phillips. “Triumph of Our Communities.” Triumph of Our Communities | Bilingual Press, 22 June 2011, bilingualpress.clas.asu.edu/book/triumph-our-communities.
- Murawski, Mike. “Telling to Live: Testimonio as Educational Praxis.” Art Museum Teaching, artmuseumteaching.com/tag/lorraine-garcia-nakata/.
- Watson, Sheila. “Museums and Their Communities.” CRC Press, 7 Aug. 2007, www.crcpress.com/Museums-and-their-Communities/Watson/p/book/9780415402606.
- Hablamos Juntos, Together We Speak Project, Curriculum/Contemporary Latina Broadside Project, Lorraine García-Nakata, Natural History, 2019
- Artistas Chicanas, The Mexican Museum, Spring Issue, 1985, San Francisco, CA
- Burgos-Debray. Verso, NY and London, 2009. (2nd Ed). The Latina Feminist Group. 2001. Telling to Live: Latina Feminist Testimonios. Duke University Press.
