= Irma Lerma-Barbosa =

Chicana American painter, printmaker, and performance artist

Irma Lerma Barbosa (born 1949) is a Chicana American painter, printmaker, and performance artist.

== Biography ==
Lerma Barbosa was born in Elko, Nevada and mostly raised in Northern California. Her mother is Mexican, and father is Mexican-Yaqui. She attended American River College in North Highlands, California, and eventually transferred to California State University Sacramento. She was recruited for a fellowship at CSUS due to her involvement in the Sacramento Brown Berets and Mexican American Education Project. She later joined the Royal Chicano Air Force, where she learned to make silkscreen prints.

== Notable works and exhibitions ==
- Women Hold up Half of the Sky (1975)
  - Women Hold Up Half of the Sky is a mural located in Chicano Park in San Diego, California painted by the women of the Royal Chicano Air Force in recognition of the role of the Chicana in El Movimiento.
- In Spirit (2022)
  - In Spirit was an exhibition at the Latino Center of Art and Culture in Sacramento, California in the spirit of Frida Kahlo and her influence. The exhibit featured the works of various artists, including Irma Lerma Barbosa, who invoke that same spirit and depict the female experience. Irma Lerma Barbosa contributed an oil painting titled La Llegada de la Despedida (The Arrival of the Farewell).
- Sacra-Momento (1969)
  - A silkscreen poster that documents Lerma Barbosa’s involvement in activism within the Sacramento chapter of the Brown Berets. The poster is based on photographs taken of Lerma Barbosa in Southside Park, a place where many Chicano/a/x gatherings in Sacramento would take place.
