= Emigdio Vasquez =

American painter (1939–2014)

- Born: Emigdio Chavez-Vasquez; May 29, 1939; Jerome, Arizona, United States
- Died: August 9, 2014 (aged 75); Newport Beach, California, United States
- Other name: "Godfather of Hispanic artists"
- Education: Santa Ana College, California State University, Fullerton
- Occupations: Fine Artist, Muralist, Teacher
- Style: Social Realism

Emigdio Vasquez (1939–2014) was a Chicano-American artist, social realist muralist and educator, known as the "Godfather of Hispanic artists". Most of his murals depict Chicano and Latin American history and feature a photorealistic style.

== Early life and education ==
Emigdio Vasquez was born on May 25, 1939, in Jerome, Arizona. His father worked for Phelps-Dodge Copper mines; and in the early 1940s his family moved to Orange, California. His interest in art was evident as early as grade school where he would replicate comic book styles to create his own comics based on stories his father told about the Mexican Revolution.

Emigdio earned an Associate of Arts degree from Santa Ana College; and he transferred to California State University, Fullerton, where he received his Bachelor of Arts and a Master's Degree in Fine Arts. In 1979, for his Master's Degree thesis project, Emigdio painted an 85-foot-long (26 m) mural as a tribute to the Chicano working class – complete with figures modeled after his father as a miner and other relatives and friends as field workers and laborers.

== Work ==
Vasquez painted over 30 public murals in central Orange County, California and over 400 fine art paintings. The most recognized mural of Emigdio’s is the "Legacy of Cesar Chavez," which is located in the lobby of the Cesar Chavez Business and Computer Center in Santa Ana College. Some of Emigdio’s favorite subjects were the subculture of Chicanos and Mexican-Americans including zoot suits and Pachucos, as well as street people and day laborers that reflected a time in history presented in his narrative style. He also enjoyed still life and landscape painting, as well as portraits of historical figures. His diversity of subject matter and style place him in a select class of artists that transcends the traditional "pigeon hole" description that most artists are assigned.

Emigdio drew upon and transformed photographs and his plein air paintings into a body of work that documented and commented on the daily life of working people in the Barrio. With painstaking skills, he recorded the urban experience without sentimentality and with dignity, neither glorifying nor criticizing. His work is often recognized as a ‘super-realistic’ style, with historical transitions and themes.

In 1996, he received an artist fellowship from the Adolph and Ester Gottlieb Foundation in New York.

=== Teaching ===
Vasquez was an instructor in the art department at Santa Ana College, and managed major public arts programs for the Bowers Museum, California Arts Council, and the City of Santa Ana - including creating a 65-foot mural at the Orange County Transportation Center in Santa Ana.

== Personal life ==
He was previously married to Rosie Lopez Schelerth. Vasquez is the father of six children. His son, Emigdio "Higgy" Vasquez has apprenticed and assisted his father on many mural projects, including preservation, restoration, and new mural creation. Vasquez's daughter, Rosemary Vasquez Tuthill is a fine art painter and muralist.

== Death and legacy ==
Vasquez died from pneumonia on August 9, 2014, in Newport Beach, California. He was 75 years old.

Several groups recognized Emigdio for his contributions to art and culture. In 2004, Emigdio was inducted into Santa Ana College Alumni Hall of Fame; in 2007, Cal State Fullerton University recognized Emigdio as one of the 50 most influential Hispanic graduates from its 50 years of existence; and on May 25, 2013, his birthday, the city of Santa Ana Proclaimed that day as Emigdio Vasquez Day.

His ex-wife, Rosie Lopez Schelerth, had written about Vasquez's early life and their marriage in her self-published autobiography, Hi! My Name is Chicken (2008).

The Cypress St. Mural Restoration: "El Proletariado de Atzlan" documentary about Emigdio Vasquez and son Higgy Vasquez, was produced and directed by Katherine Bowers for Chapman University. It was selected for the Orange County Film Fiesta. The documentary explains the restoration at the Cypress St. Mural by son Higgy. It includes the life and times of Emigdio Vasquez, his journey from his birthplace in Jerome, Arizona to Orange, California and where Vasquez's early interest in drawing led to a lifetime of fine art painting. The overall project was honored and selected as part of the Getty Center’s “Pacific Standard Time."
