= Rodolfo Cuellar =

Rodolfo "Rudy" Cuellar is an artist based in Sacramento that was a part of the Royal Chicano Air Force. He is known for the prints that he created to help fight for the equality of Mexican Americans, and support the local community.

== Background ==
Rodolfo "Rudy" Cuellar was born on November 13, 1950, and raised in Auburn, California by his parents who were Mexican immigrants. In 1910, Mexico was undergoing a revolution, this was the time when Cuellar's parents fled for the United States looking for a better life for themselves and their future family.

Cuellar learned the basics of art during his time at Roseville High School. Following his graduation from Roseville, he attended a nearby college, Sierra College, where he was exposed to a larger variety of arts such as ceramics. Cuellar's involvement really took off when he transferred to Sacramento State University, where he was exposed to even more art fields through his professors involved in the Royal Chicano Air Force (RCAF).

== Involvement with the community ==
After his work in college, he took his skills and began to apply them to the community. Even while being involved in the Chicano movement, he looked to serve the larger community by teaching silkscreening in local prisons. He mainly taught silkscreening to the inmates at Folsom State Prison. However, his service stretched further than teaching in prisons, he also was very active within the school community during the 1970s. He worked for the unprivileged children, teaching them the basics to art and design as a part of the Centro de Artistas Chicanos. Cuellar's work in the Centro de Artistas Chicanos also exposed him to creating signs and posters for community events, which is where his work began to reach significantly larger audiences.

== Royal Chicano Air Force (RCAF) and Cuellar ==
The Royal Chicano Air Force (RCAF), not to be confused with the Royal Canadian Air Force, was originally known as Rebel Chicano Art Front. The acronym was mistaken to be the Royal Canadian Air Force, so they combined their original name with this and created The Royal Chicano Air Force name. The RCAF was formed as a way for individuals to fight for the rights of those born in the United States of Mexican descent. The founders included artists such as Jose Montaya and Esteban Villa who started this group simply from mentoring their college students and encouraging them to portray their Mexican Heritage. However, it grew and other artists such as Rudy Cuellar any many other individuals within the Sacramento community began to become involved with this group. The work the RCAF did stretched much further than just fighting for rights of Mexican America, it also consisted of helping with afterschool art and acting programs and festivals. in 1972, the RCAF created the Centro de Artistas Chicanos which took their community service to another level, offering workshops to the people on Sacramento. The Centros de Artistas Chicanos did more than just offer workshops to the Sacramento community, they also did them in nursing homes where they had college art students teach lessons. This was these artists way of teaching the local community about their Mexican heritage through art.

When it comes to their work, Latinos and Chicanos were quiet aware of the lack of representation in galleries. Despite the lack of representation in mainstream institutions, artists created the RCAF for the purpose of not only helping the community but also as a way of showing their pride for their heritage. One of the most created pieces, was their silkscreen posters as it was very inexpensive and easy to produce. The RCAF used these silkscreen posters as a form of advocacy for the rights of Mexican Americans, to promote their culture, and to support the United Farm Workers movement which fought for better pay and equality for farm workers. In movement such as the United Farm Workers Movement, artists in the RCAF were able to produce posters, flags, and other signs that brought the need for equal rights to the front of the United States awareness. Silkscreen posters allowed for Chicano artists to continue to add a creative touches, while still being based on Mexican heritage and fighting for the rights of Mexican Americans. The most important part of silkscreening was not the ability for artists to manipulate the image represented, but instead that they were cheap and easy to replicate. For artists who certainly were excluded from mainstream media and galleries, the ability to mass-produce their work was extremely important in order to reach a larger audience. The pieces they created were mostly displayed in stores such as coffee shops, restaurants, and other communal spaces as these were the places their work could be seen the most. These locations allowed the RCAF's artists to receive the attention of not only people who could have viewed their work in art galleries, but also the largest majority who didn't. These posters made a serious impact in the success of movement such as the Chicano Civil Right Movement and the United Farm Workers Movement. In the end, the RCAF used screen printing as a way of building up the recognition of Mexican American artists, but also used it as a resource to fight for Chicano rights.

Rodolfo Cuellar, or Rudy, was a key member in the Royal Chicano Air Force. Creating pieces such as "Humor in Xhicano Arte 200 years of Oppression 1776-1976" in 1976, Cuellar was fighting for the equal rights of Mexican Americans in the United States. In this poster, Cuellar challenges the idea that the United States gained its freedom as groups like Latinos and Chicanos still feel as though they are not experiencing the same freedoms as others. Cuellars use of symbols such as the chains really emphasize who held back that he and the Chicano community feel during this time. Further, Cuellar is able to incorporate other symbols in his pieces, such as "Always and Forever" in Lowrider Carrucha Show as a way of showing Mexicans are here to stay, and deserve to be treated fairly and equally.

== Cuellar's work ==
Some of the following work are announcement posters created by Rudy Cuellar, and others are created with the purpose of political activism. But all below are worked on by Rudy Cuellar:

Rudy Cuellar Lowride Posters---at Smithsonian Online Virtual Archives

- This image depicts two individuals riding in a classic car in an advertisement for a car and bike show on August 15 of 1981. Other than the car, he also includes other important information for the show, such as the entrance fee and sponsorships. In terms of color, it is simplistic but elaborate with the line patterns he creates.

Humor in Xhicano Arte 200 years of Oppression 1776-1976---Smithsonian American Art Museum

- This image depicts an individuals with a chain around his mouth symbolizing the lack of voice he has. The figure take up the majority of the screen, and surrounding it Cuellar limits the words to important information and dates. In terms of the color, it is simplistic as the meaning behind the image is more important than the colors he uses.

10 y 6 de Septiembre---Center for the Study of Political Graphics

- This image depicts an eagle with a snake hanging from its mouth, and a flag dangling from its foot. Cuellar uses a larger variety of colors, and different font sizes in order to draw the viewers attention to all aspects of the print. He keeps the text limited however to just the important information for the even this print was created for.

Fiesta de Maiz---Center for the Study of Political Graphics

- This image depicts a large stock with a corn cob poking out of the top for "Fiesta de Maiz". In the background, Cuellar combines colors to create a sunset as the event goes from noon to dusk. He keeps the text plain and short, only including the important information for the festival.

Caesar Chavez 7pm Oct. 5---Center for the Study of Political Graphics

- This image depicts the figure "Caesar Chavez" and large text throughout the print. This image appears to be giving the intended audience information about a ceremony honoring this figure. While the text is large, he keeps it minimal. He also only uses three colors as a way of keeping the viewers attention of the information he wrote.

16 September on the 17 Independence Celebration of 1810---Center for the Study of Political Graphics

- This image depicts four figures with a large variety of colors. He includes the larger variety of colors in a unique pattern surrounding the heads to draw attention to them. Unlike a lot of his other work, he also includes a larger amount of text at the bottom of the print.

CAPS Committee to Abolish Prison Slavery---Center for the Study of Political Graphics

- This image depicts two large hands, with a chain surrounding the outside of the print. Again he uses more information, but the most important information is portrayed larger and in a different color. He uses what appears to be his three most common colors again, those being black, white and red to keep it straight to the point.

Fiesta Campesina---Center for the Study of Political Graphics

- This image depicts a plant, one that appears to be a tomato plant as there are four circular red objects hanging from the branches of the plant. Similarly to Fiesta de Maiz, Cuellar puts a sunset in the background. Similar to his simplistic style, he keeps the amount of text minimal to only the most important information.

Guatemala Earthquake---Center for the Study of Political Graphics

- This image depicts a bunch of figures, both men and women, with a crack down the middle symbolizing the earthquakes impact on Guatemala. The piece appears to be the beginning of a larger presentation as it almost seems incomplete as there are words missing. Again, he uses black, white and red to portray the situation.

Jose G Posada Mexican Printmaker 1852-1913---Center for the Study of Political Graphics

- This image depicts two men, and a skeleton that is dressed in feminine looking clothing. He uses a cursive script on the bottom of this image, making it in gold, which makes the viewer think this is a print for the remembrance of an important figure.

Kermes Nuestra Señora de Guadalupe---Center for the Study of Political Graphics

- This image depicts a religious figure in the center of the print. Unlike the typical prints, the colors are significantly more vibrant, but still draw your attention to the figure. The text is limited, as Cuellar only includes the most important information and the dates.

Cinco de Mayo--- Calisphere, University of California Santa Barbara

- This image is presented with an eagle that has a snake dangling from its mouth. The eagle is in the center of the Mexican flag that Cuellar uses as the background, and then layers the information on top of the three panels. Compared to his other works, he includes a lot more information and no dates, leading the viewer to believe this is to teach people about Cinco de Mayo instead of promoting a festival.

La Raza Law Students Association---Calisphere, University of California Santa Barbara

- This image is full, with two intertwined snakes being the center of attention in this print. Behind the snakes, he uses the earth as a background. Instead of red, he used a light blue in contrast of the white and black font. He includes a lot of information to let viewers know more about the "Law Students Association".

Mercado De Las Flores---Calisphere, University of California Santa Barbara

- This image depicts a classic red car in the center of print. He includes a relatively minimal amount of information, however it is all large and important such as the date and location of the event. Using his typical red, black and white, he keeps the attention focused on the car and the information about the event.

3 Pianos Xicanos---Calisphere, University of California Santa Barbara

- This image doesn't depict any figures, but instead portrays a lot of information. In the background, Cuellar gradients from red to purple with a piano in the bottom right and into the middle of the print. On top of the background, he writes a variety of information in different fonts, sizes and colors to keep readers reading the entirety of the information.

Lowrider Carrucha Show---Calisphere, University of California Santa Barbara

- This image is one of Cuellars most elaborate pieces. In this image it gradients from yellow to orange to dark blue and purple with stars at the top of the image showing a sunset into the late evening when this event runs to. In the middle he depicts a large car that appears to be floating. Then he includes minimal, but large text to give viewers the information needed for the event.

Para Mis Jerifas Since the Dawn of Time---Calisphere, University of California Santa Barbara

- This image is separated into three sections. On the left, there is a large picture of a corn cob on the end of a stock. On the right, there is a small calendar for the month of May, and a small amount of information in the top right. Cuellar uses mainly yellow in this image, but also some green, black, and white.

Bilingual Education Says Twice as Much---Calisphere, University of California Santa Barbara

- This image depicts two figures on opposite sides of the print. Each figure has white word bubbles coming out of their mouthes. Based on the title, Cuellar depicts these two figures speaking different languages. On the bottom, he includes large lettering but minimal information. In the background, he gradients from light blue to dark blue.

Los Lupenos Perform 'Mextizol'---Calisphere, University of California Santa Barbara

- This image is very elaborate, with a lot of designs and colors. He includes what appears to be indigenous figures, one in the top right and one in the bottom left. In the remaining space, Cuellar includes a lot of text in a variety of sizes and fonts. Making this print more of an infographic based piece than a poster.

La Historia De California 1977---Calisphere, University of California Santa Barbara

- This image is unique. There are only a couple words, which is just the title of the piece, above a church and figure on the left side of the image. There are also a couple other symbols and figures on the right handed side of the image. The most prominent color is yellow, with some white and brown/black being used as well.

Lowrider Council---Calisphere, University of California Santa Barbara

- This image is depicting a car event upcoming. There is a car on the left, and limited words that explain only the most important information for the event. Cuellar presents the text in different colors, sizes, and fonts. In this he only includes information such as the date, the times, and the location of the event.

Omega Gallery---Calisphere, University of California Santa Barbara

- This image has a large circle in the center of the print. In this circle, Cuellar shows the night sky with a square moon and a shadow of the moon on the ground. Around this scene, there are limited words and patterns. Cuellar only gives the dates, the times, and the location of this event.

== Bibliography ==
Harvard University. "Royal Chicano Air Force Posters." Harvard Library. Accessed April 19, 2026. https://library.harvard.edu/collections/royal-chicano-air-force-posters.

Romo, Terezita. "Rebels with La Causa: Royal Chicano Air Force Art and Activism, 1970-1990." Crocker Art Museum. Last modified March 24, 2026. Accessed April 19, 2026. https://www.crockerart.org/blog/post/rebels-with-la-causa-royal-chicano-air-force-art-and-activism-1970-1990.

Sacramento State University. "Oral history interview with Rudy Cuellar, May 10, 2014." Sacramento State University Library: Digital Collections. Last modified May 10, 2014. Accessed April 27, 2026. https://csus.contentdm.oclc.org/digital/collection/chicano/id/13/.

Scott, Chadd. "Royal Chicano Air Force Artists Continue Taking Flight In Sacramento." Forbes. Last modified March 2026. Accessed April 19, 2026. https://www.forbes.com/sites/chaddscott/2026/03/18/royal-chicano-air-force-artists-continue-taking-flight-in-sacramento/.

Smithsonian. "Rodolfo O. Cuellar." Smithsonian American Art Museum. Accessed April 19, 2026. https://americanart.si.edu/exhibitions/chicano-graphics/online/humor-xhicano-arte.

Smithsonian. "Rudy Cuellar Lowrider Posters." Smithsonian Institution: Smithsonian Online Virtual Archives. Accessed April 19, 2026. https://sova.si.edu/record/nmah.ac.1514.

University of California. "Royal Chicano Air Force Archives, 1973-1988." UC Santa Barbara, Special Research Collection. Accessed May 3, 2026. https://oac.cdlib.org/findaid/ark:/13030/kt9d5nd53d/?query=RCAF.

Zapata, Claudia. "Chicano Artists Challenging History and Reclaiming Cultural Memory." Smithsonian American Art Museum and the Renwick Gallery. Smithsonian. Last modified May 6, 2021. Accessed April 19, 2026. https://www.smithsonianmag.com/blogs/smithsonian-american-art-museum/2021/05/06/chicano-artists-challenging-history-and-reclaiming-cultural-memory/.
