= José Montoya =

American poet (1932–2013)

- Born: 28 May 1932; Albuquerque, New Mexico, U.S.
- Died: 25 September 2013 (aged 81); Sacramento, California, U.S.
- Citizenship: United States
- Occupation: Professor
- Writing career
- Language: English and Spanish
- Genre: Chicano poetry

José Montoya (May 28, 1932 – September 25, 2013) was a poet and an artist from Sacramento, California. He was one of the most influential Chicano bilingual poets. He has published many well-known poems in anthologies and magazines, and served as Sacramento's poet laureate.

== Biography ==
He was born in Albuquerque, New Mexico and raised, along with his brother, Malaquias Montoya, in the San Joaquin Valley in California. He and his family were migrant farm workers and Montoya started helping in the fields at age nine. The experience made Montoya decide that "farm work would not be his destiny." His mother was an artist herself, stenciling images for churches and homes and creating her own pigments and his experiences assisting her helped him think about becoming an artist.

From 1951 to 1955, he served in the United States Navy. After the Korean War, he used his G.I. Bill to go to college. He entered San Diego City College as an art student, Montoya later transferred to the California College of Arts & Crafts in Oakland, California. He graduated with a Bachelor of Arts in 1962. He began his career by teaching at Wheatland Union High School. Later, he earned his MA in 1971 from California State University, Sacramento. He taught Chicana/o studies in the Department of Art at California State University, Sacramento. Here, he worked for over twenty five years and started a unique program called the "Barrio Art Program." This program worked with student teachers who went into neighborhoods that were traditionally "under-served" in order to teach art to young people. He died of lymphoma in 2013.

== Artistic Career ==
In the early 1970s, Montoya joined his students and members of the Chicano community to found the Rebel Chicano Art Front (RCAF), which became one of the most important and politically engaged Chicano art groups. They used the initials RCAF to sign their posters. Some observers interpreted the initials to be those of the Royal Canadian Air Force. As Montoya recalls, "Finally, someone just said, 'No man, we’re the Royal Chicano Air Force!'” Thereafter, the group semi-adopted the "mistaken moniker," and rolled with the name Royal Chicano Air Force, which led to performances in which they wore flight helmets and jackets, and drove around in a jeep.

The group supported the activities of Cesar Chavez and helped to advance the cause of the United Farm Worker's movement. The RCAF under Montoya and his artist comrades produced numerous silk screen posters and organized numerous cultural, educational, and political activities in the Sacramento area and well beyond. They also did community work, such as the "Breakfast for Niños" program that served food to children in poor neighborhoods.

Marti Dense describes Montoya as "a leading figure in bilingual and bicultural expression drawn from barrio life," and says "his life and work accounts for historical change amid world wars, the counter culture and rise of the civil rights movements." Finally, "as an artist, poet, and musician, he produced iconic works depicting pachuco and pachuca culture based on his own experiences as a youth after World War II."

According to Arte Americas, "Montoya was the embodiment of the urgent, resourceful, and multifaceted art of the Chicano Movement era and beyond. Known for his sense of humor and unfailing wit, Montoya inspired and educated many generations of artists in the same rebellious/activist/avant garde Chicano tradition."

A sense of his influence can be garnered from the tributes to him on Latinopia in 2013.

=== Pachuco Series ===
Montoya began his influential Pachuco series in 1969. His exhibition Pachuco Art: A Historical Update, held in Sacramento, CA in 1977, was the first public showing of a series that garnered national and international attention. In this series, Montoya was influenced by Ricardo Favela's small sculptures of contemporary vatos, which he connected to Pachucos. The exhibition, curated by Rene Yañez, was accompanied by a booklet published by the Royal Chicano Air Force Cultural Affairs Committee. In the booklet, Montoya "describes the intense criticism he received from both Mexican conservative and Chicano 'radical' viewers. Montoya argues against both types of criticism, declaring that the series was his attempt at redeeming and reviving the memory of pachucos, whom he calls the first 'freedom-fighters' of the Chicano Movement." The exhibition included photographs and documents pertaining to the 1943 Zoot Suit Riots in Los Angeles, when sailors and others violently attacked Mexican Americans who wore Zoot Suits.

The most famous work in this series is a print called José Montoya's Pachuco Art, A Historical Update, which served as a publicity poster for the exhibition. Made with the assistance of Rodolfo O. Cuellar and Luis C. González, it is in the collection of the Smithsonian American Art Museum, as well as other museums. Curator Ruben C. Cordova, who calls it "one of the most admired poster images of the Chicano movement," points out: "the long lines of the high waist Pachuco Zoot Suit pants and the rakish Pachuco hat have been transformed into garb that could almost be mistaken for the clothes of a farm worker (at least one archive misidentifies these pants as overalls)." He adds: "The skull is rendered in a manner similar to one of Posada’s images of a Zapatista revolutionary, and the large hat that he wears is even a little reminiscent of the giant hat worn by Posada’s and Rivera’s Catrina. Thus Montoya is placing himself (and Chicano art in general) in a revolutionary lineage that extends from Zapata, Posada, and Rivera, through the Pachucos, and finally 'updated' to the Chicano era."

According to Arte Americas, the Pachuco exhibition's importance was in "reframing the pachuco from the media sensationalized delinquent to 'the first freedom fighters of the Chicano Movement.' " The influence of Montoya's Zoot Suited Mexican Americans and Chicanos extended even into Texas, where they influenced work by artists as varied as Cesar Martinez, Adan Hernandez, and Vincent Valdez.

=== Abundant Harvest Exhibition ===
In 2016 UCLA's Fowler Museum held the largest exhibition of Montoya's work on paper, called ”José Montoya’s Abundant Harvest: Works on Paper/Works on Life." It featured almost 2,000 works, including quick drawings executed on scrap paper and napkins. The museum referred to Montoya as "a pivotal figure in the Chicano movement who captured its struggles and victories in his singular drawings, paintings and poems."

== Literary Career ==
His poetic career was said to have begun with the publication of his poem, "La Jefita" (1969) in El Grito: A Journal of Contemporary Mexican-American Thought. His poetry was noted for using code switching, barrio slang and for its themes about struggling against injustice.

His son Richard Montoya is a member of the performance troupe Culture Clash.

=== "El Louie" ===
Hoy enterraron al Louie.
And San Pedro o san pinche
Are in for it. And those
Times of the forties
And the early fifties
Lost un vato de atolle.

— El Louie, 1969

"El Louie" is probably Montoya's most famous and most often anthologized poem. With compassion and anger, it tells the story of Louie, a pachuco from San José and California's Central Valley who is a popular local figure. After he comes back from the war in Korea his life disintegrates as he continues coming into conflict with the white-dominated world of California; he is a hero and a loser, hocking his combat medals for booze and drugs; he dies alone in squalid conditions. Louie is not elevated to gangster sainthood, but he is "recognized as a normative model" rather than portrayed as deviant, dangerous or insignificant.

=== Literary Works ===
- Montoya, José. El Sol y Los De Abajo and other R.C.A.F. poems por José Montoya. San Francisco: Ediciones Pocho-che, 1972.
- Montoya, José. In Formation: 20 Years of Joda. Chusma House Publications, 1992.
- Trio Casindio and the Royal Chicano Air Force. 20 Years of Songs by José Montoya.
- Montoya, José. Los Compas: Chale Gallego y'l Xorty. Copilot Press, 2010.

== See also ==
- List of Chicano poets
- Tortilla art

== Sources ==
- Elliott, Emory. The Columbia Literary History of the United States. NY: Columbia UP, 1988.
- Hernandez, Guillermo E. Chicano Satire. 2 March 2004. https://web.archive.org/web/20040302235506/http://www.sscnet.ucla.edu/csrc/gmo/span145/articles/satirepgs52-84.html. Austin: U of TX P, 1991.
- Montoya, José. In Formation: 20 Years of Joda. Aztlán: Chusma House Publications, 1992.
