= Ricardo Favela =

American artist & academic (1944–2007)

Ricardo Favela (January 13, 1944 – July 15, 2007) was an American artist, professor, and civil rights activist based in Sacramento, California. He was a founding member of the Chicano art collective group Royal Chicano Air Force.

== Life and career ==
Favela was born in Kingsburg, California. He attended Sacramento State University where he received his B.A. in 1971 and M.A. in 1989. Favela began teaching art classes at Sacramento State University in the 1980s and eventually became a full-time professor in the Art Department in 1997.

Favela worked in screen printing and ceramic sculptures. His artworks are in the collections of the Smithsonian American Art Museum and the University Galleries of Sacramento State University.

== Death ==
Favela died of a heart attack on July 15, 2007, in Visalia, California.

== Legacy ==
Ricardo Favela Park in the McKinley Village neighborhood of Sacramento, California is named for Favela.
