= Esteban Villa =

American artist (1930–2022)

Esteban Villa (August 3, 1930 – May 16, 2022) was an American muralist, artist, and Chicano activist. A professor emeritus at California State University, Sacramento, his teaching career began in 1962 at the high school level and included assignments at Washington State University, D–Q University, University of California, Davis, and numerous lecture and slide presentations, art exhibits and mural projects at universities mainly in California and surrounding states. He served as an art consultant to schools and organizations including Centro de Artistas Chicanos, and did art programs in the prison system. He was a founding member of the Royal Chicano Air Force, a collective of artists, professors and students, which was formed amid the Chicano Movimiento's push for social and political rights.

In addition, Villa was involved in the production of the KVIE-TV documentary Pilots of Aztlán, a film about the Royal Chicano Air Force, which he co-founded. This film, in which he appears along with other RCAF members, was aired on KVIE in January, 1995. He exhibited a major survey of his paintings and related works at the Galeria Posada in February through March, 1995, titled The Art of Esteban Villa, and was in a group art show at Encina Art Gallery during Feb/March, 1995.

Born in Tulare, California on August 3, 1930, Villa died in Sacramento California on May 16, 2022, at the age of 91.
