= Royal Chicano Air Force =

Art collective in Sacramento, California

The Royal Chicano Air Force (RCAF) is a Sacramento, California-based art collective, founded in 1970 by Ricardo Favela, José Montoya and Esteban Villa. It was one of the "most important collective artist groups" in the Chicano art movement in California during the 1970s and the 1980s and continues to be influential into the 21st century.

== History ==
=== Founding and name ===
In 1969 José Montoya moved to Sacramento to pursue a master's degree at CSU Sacramento. He and newly hired art professor Esteban Villa, who had founded the Mexican American Liberation Art Front, a Chicano movement group founded in Oakland with Montoya's brother Malaquias, Manuel Hernandez and Rene Yañez, became active and soon created a circle of artists and activists interested in political and cultural work. The Rebel Chicano Arts Front, or RCAF, was founded by Montoya, Villa, and their students to foster the arts in the Chicano/Latino community, to educate young people in arts, history and culture, promote political awareness, and to promote support for César Chávez and the United Farm Workers in the heavily agricultural Sacramento-Davis area. Regarding its name, one day when someone asked if "RCAF" meant the "Royal Canadian Air Force", one of the artists jokingly responded, "No, it means the Royal Chicano Air Force!" From then on, the artists used the "Air Force" motif in their artworks, programs, and activities.

=== Activities ===
Through the organizational framework of a collective, artists and community members established a silk screen operation to create multiples of images promoting art, cultural activities, community events, and political action. The work of Jose Guadalupe Posada, a Mexican printer of the late 1800s and early 1900s, inspired the artists for this work. At the same time, with the example of the great Mexican muralists, the artists undertook mural painting to bring cultural images and history to a larger audience. The organization grew to the point where a need for a space for artists was planned. The RCAF established the Centro de Artistas Chicanos moving from temporary quarters in homes, garages and La Raza Bookstore to Holy Angels School at 7th and T Streets. Later, a space was established on Folsom Blvd. and finally a center on Franklin Blvd. These spaces allowed for continual meetings, planning of events, workshops, studio activity and freedom to work around the clock. First, Max Garcia took on the directorship, followed by Gina Montoya and Ricardo Favela. Thousands of posters were created over the years with designs from multiple artists. Murals were painted throughout Sacramento (many now painted over) as well as Chicano Park in San Diego and in Washington and Oregon. Through the university, Jose Montoya, Esteban Villa and, later, Ricardo Favela, taught a generation of young artists the techniques of silk screen, muralism, drawing, and painting. At Moses Lake, Washington Community College, Lorraine García-Nakata taught ceramics, painting and drawing to young students of color (Black, Brown, Persian, other). Jose Montoya went on to establish the Barrio Art Program, representing an effort to reduce barriers between the CSU campus and the Alkalai Flats community. The Barrio Art Program brought young people and senior citizens together with aspiring teachers in the university's teacher training courses to learn to integrate the arts with education. The program continues to this day at the Washington Neighborhood Center located in downtown Sacramento at 16th and D Streets. Other RCAF artists, like Juanishi Orosco, Armando Cid and Rudy Cuellar taught there as well as in other community settings. Armando Cid and Juan Cervantez became artist facilitators in the Arts in Corrections Program teaching art and bringing guest artists to adult inmates. Lorraine García-Nakata also became Lead Artist at San Quentin Prison teaching visual art to (maximum security, condemned row, and lower security) inmates and she also directed twelve other cross-disciplinary artists who taught additional workshops in literature, music, visual arts, and theatre. The RCAF had also a history of bringing the arts to youth offenders within the California Youth Authority, specifically at the reform school known as the Preston School of Industry in Ione, CA.

=== La Raza Bookstore and Galeria Posada ===
Through the efforts of RCAF members and Sacramento State students, Phillip "Pike" Santos and Louie "the Foot" Gonzalez, La Raza Bookstore was established in 1972. The inaccessibility of published works about or by Chicanos and Native Americans led to this effort. The Bookstore was located at 1228 F Street, Sacramento. In 1980, a gallery was added and the name was changed to La Raza / Galeria Posada (in honor of the Mexican printer, José Guadalupe Posada). The RCAF artists were featured in exhibitions, but perhaps more importantly it became the exhibition space for countless numbers of Chicana/o and Native American visual artists. As a community bookstore and gallery, it became an active center for Chicana/o, Latina/o, and Native American art, poetry and music. Beginning with Phillip Santos, the organization was administered by Tere Romo, Josie S. Talamantez, Armando Cid, Victoria Plata, Luis Chabolla, Marisa Gutierrez, Francisca Godinez, and Marie Acosta. In 2014, La Raza/Galeria Posada ceased to exist.

=== Music ===
Through its work in organizing exhibitions, mercados, dances, and cultural celebrations, the role of music became an important component of the RCAF. Freddie Rodriguez established the Royal Chicano Air Force Band, an ensemble performing a variety of genres from cumbias to blues. The RCAF Band featured lead singer Gloria Rangel who was later joined by her sister Irma "Cui Cui" Rangel. The band performed throughout Northern and Central California. The effort was successful in crystallizing the sounds of the barrio and taking the message of the RCAF to the people. Freddie's RCAF Band created, wrote, and performed a Chicano rock opera "Xicindio" in 1980 at the Sacramento Community Theatre for a national conference of bilingual educators that was later aired on PBS. The band eventually broke up with Freddie Rodriguez remaining in Sacramento where illness took his life. Gloria Rangel also died shortly after the band broke up but had returned to Los Angeles. Irma Rangel continues to perform and record under her name. Others, most notably Jose Montoya and Esteban Villa continued to play corridos and ballads playing their guitars. With the arrival of maestro Rudy Carrillo, the quality of performance grew and original music was composed leading to the establishment of El Trio Casindio—a four or more sized ensemble. An album was recorded and released entitled "All Day Music". More on this below.

=== Joe Serna ===
Another important alliance came with the work of Joe Serna, Jr. Joe and his family had returned to Sacramento in 1968 from service in the Peace Corps in the mountains of Guatemala. His interest in political change was in his core. He had been a child in a farmworker family and his commitment to work with Cesar Chavez and the United Farmworkers came early. He joined with the RCAF to further that work. The RCAF embraced Joe and soon thereafter worked with him to carry out the work of organizing and engaging in local political campaigns leading to the election of the first Mexican American to the City Council in a century. Joe Serna taught political courses at CSUS and eventually worked for the Lieutenant Governor, Mervyn Dymally before he embarked on his own political career. He ran for and became a Sacramento city councilman. Later he became the mayor of Sacramento until his death by cancer in November, 1999. His wife, Isabel Hernandez, also an ardent member of the RCAF circle since the 1970s died a year after Joe from cancer as well.

=== Impact ===
Members of the RCAF have worked as educators in all levels of education: elementary, high school, community college and university; they have taught in prisons, youth correctional facilities, neighborhood community centers and cultural facilities. They have served as artists in residence for the Sacramento Metropolitan Arts Commission (SMAC) and the California Arts Council. They have served as board members and trustees of many arts organizations including La Raza Galeria Posada, the SMAC, the San Francisco Arts Commission, the Western States Arts Federation, the Concilio de Arte Popular and the Commission to Study the Potential Creation of the National Museum of the American Latino.

Two special major collections of RCAF posters have been donated by Ricardo Favela to the CSU Sacramento Archives and Special Collections Department and to San Jose State University. These Favela collections will provide academics, researchers and community members a valuable visual art resource for the future. The majority of their other posters, photographs, personal papers and organizational materials have been donated by Favela and various members of the RCAF to the California Ethnic and Multicultural Archives at the Donald Davidson Library at the University of California, Santa Barbara and Colección Tloque Nahuaque.

== Promotional activities ==
The RCAF began operating out of the Washington Neighborhood Center and frequently held events at Sacramento's Southside Park. To fund their activities and to support the farmworkers, they held dances, performances, and other fundraisers, for which they created promotional posters that visually incorporated the themes of the Chicano Movement. They also received funding support from the Washington Neighborhood Center and California State University, Sacramento.

The RCAF painted murals throughout Sacramento, as well as several in San Diego's Chicano Park and one in Burley, Idaho. Community art workshops included the Barrio Art Program and the Anciano Art Project, for children and the elderly, respectively. For high school and college students, there were workshops in silkscreening and muralism.

The members of the RCAF did not restrict their activities to the arts. Inspired by the free breakfast programs of the Black Panther Party, they and other activists such as Jennie Baca and Rosemary Rasul implemented the Breakfast for Niños program for impoverished schoolchildren in the Sacramento area. Members of the RCAF also established a book store that would become La Raza Bookstore that would eventually be known as La Raza Galeria Posada still operating in Sacramento. The RCAF, under the directorship of Gilbert Gamino, ran an automotive repair cooperative called Aeronaves de Aztlán.

== Cultural activities ==
The RCAF organized cultural activities such as a yearly poetry readings called "Flor y Canto", and revived indigenous Mexican practices such as celebrations of harvest ("Fiesta de Maíz") and the rainy season ("Fiesta de Tlaloc"). Tere Romo, who worked with the RCAF to re-establish the Día de los Muertos celebration in Sacramento in 1975, said that they had "an Indigenous ceremony with dance offerings, along with a Catholic mass, because there were a lot of older, traditional people there, and it's a holy day of obligation for Catholics." They soon established the Centro de Artistas Chicanos, a workshop for the production of posters for community events. There, thousands of posters were created over the years. Out of all this activity came the music of the Royal Chicano Air Force Band established by Freddie Rodriguez and featured the vocals of Gloria Rangel and Irma Rangel. Eventually, Esteban and Jose established the Trio Casindio under the strong mentorship of Rudy Carrillo. Their first recording, All Day Music, was released in 1985.

In 1995, Steve LaRosa and KVIE-TV, a public television station in Sacramento produced a film on the RCAF. Entitled, "Pilots of Aztlán: The Flights of the RCAF", the film has been shown annually throughout the region. In 2008, KVIE produced a follow-up DVD entitled, "The RCAF Flies Again".

== Awards ==
In 2007, La Galeria de La Raza, San Francisco honored Juan Carrillo with the Premio Galeria for his contributions to the Latino arts community. In 2010, the RCAF was honored by the National Association of Latino Arts and Culture (NALAC) for Lifetime Achievements at its national conference in San Jose, Ca. In May, 2011, José Montoya was honored at a Sacramento concert at César Chávez Plaza as one of the "Fathers" of the Chicano Art Movement.

== Recent events ==
The collective continues to operate presenting group and individual art exhibits while Villa and Montoya have added recordings to their repertoire. Recent exhibits of the RCAF members occurred at CSU Sacramento Library Gallery, 2007, Arte Americas in Fresno, 2008 and The Sacramento Central Library, 2009, the Brickhouse Gallery, La Raza Galeria Posada, Luna's Cafe and the Washington Neighborhood Center, all in Sacramento. Following his 2007 "heartaches & Jalapenos" CD release of original songs, Esteban Villa released his second CD of original music in 2010 entitled Habanero Honey. In June 2013 Villa's third CD, "Holy Mole!" was released.

Prior to his death in 2009, Armando Cid was commissioned to restore his murals at the Washington Square Apartments. His family saw to it that the project was completed and installed. The unveiling took place in August, 2010.

In the late summer, 2011, the RCAF members began to restore their murals located in Chicano Park, Barrio Logan, San Diego. Jose Montoya, Esteban Villa, Juanishi Orosco and Celia Hernandez were contracted as lead artists and were responsible for the work. Teams of artists including Sam Quinones, Danny Orosco, Domingo Orosco, Juan Manuel Carrillo, Carlos Lopez, Tomas Montoya, Maceo Montoya and Irma Lerma-Barbosa participated in the work. The City of Sacramento has begun negotiations with RCAF members to restore the ?Metamorphosis" mural on the city parking lot at 4th and L Streets. Stan Padilla, Esteban Villa and Juanishi Orosco will lead these efforts. To promote the forthcoming restoration, the City of Sacramento invited the three artists to exhibit their work in the Robert T. Matsui Gallery in City Hall beginning Dec 3 2014 running through Mar 3 2015. Another RCAF exhibit will occur in the Sacramento County Supervisors Chambers beginning Jan 25, 2015 and running for six months.

Juanishi Orosco received a commission to paint "Capaces", a mural completely covering the four exterior walls at a Chicano service center in Woodburn, Oregon in the summer of 2013.

The membership of the Royal Chicano Air Force additionally organize a scholarship fund, called the RCAF Memorial Scholarship, which awards 10 Sacramento Area students (as of the fundraising drive for the 2015 scholarship) each a $500.00 boost towards their continued educational goals. The scholarship is funded by donations from the current RCAF membership and the surrounding community, art shows, fundraisers, raffles and the like. The group is currently contemplating an online fundraising platform to allow the scholarship to be more accessible to qualified students.

On September 25, 2013, Jose Montoya, the co-founder of the RCAF, died of a lymphoma on his aorta. He was 81. Read the article from the Sacramento Bee for a greater scope of his life and contributions. Jose was a "Respected Elder" of D.Q.U., and proud of his Indigenous blood.

Sam Quiñones died of a heart attack early Friday morning, October 3, 2014, in Sacramento, CA. He was born in San Andreas, Calaveras County, CA. He attended CSU Sacramento and graduated with a degree in Communication Studies. He was an electrician and owned his own business. His contribution to the arts was through his decades of photographing and video taping arts and culture activities of the RCAF and other artists. He leaves his partner, Lucy Rhodes Montoya and a daughter from a previous marriage.

Four days after Sam Quiñones died, on Tuesday, Oct. 7, 2014, Juan Cervantes died from complications arising from a quadruple bypass. He fought for over two weeks after his surgery, but his body ran out of the energy to survive. His life was about making art and teaching. He was a printmaker, a painter and a muralist. Raised in Roseville, CA, he went on to study artmaking at Sierra College and CSU Sacramento. He worked in the CA prison system for many years (as had many RCAF artists) before his work with high school and middle school students in Elk Grove. He is survived by three adult children. His early silkscreen posters are part of the Favela Collection at CSU Sacramento and in the San Jose State University archives. His contribution to the RCAF mural in Southside Park, Sacramento, remains for all to enjoy.

== Founding members ==
- José Montoya (deceased)
- Esteban Villa (deceased)
- Ricardo Favela (deceased)
- Armando R. Cid (deceased)
- Juan "Juanishi" V. Orosco (deceased)
- Rodolfo "Rudy" Cuellar
- Luis "Louie the Foot" Gonzalez
- Juan M. Carrillo
- Joe Serna, Jr. (deceased)
- Stan Padilla
- Lorraine García-Nakata
- Irma Lerma-Barbosa
- Juan Cervantes (deceased)
- Maximino "Max" Elias Garcia (deceased)

Other members include: Sam Rios, Hector Gonzalez, Josie Talamantez, Tere Romo, Katy Romo, Luzma Espinosa, Elvia Nava, Susie Miranda, Frank Godina, Eli Nuñez, Mary Garza Gee, Isabel Hernandez (deceased), Gina Montoya, Danny and Irene Frias, Rudy Morones, Arturo “Turtle” Rodriguez, Ged Martin, Oralia Polendo, Gloria Torres, Manuel Diaz, Raulie Suarez, Rosa Hernandez, Lorraine Garcia-Nakata, Tim Quintero, Bennie Trujillo (deceased), Miguel Escobedo, Freddie Gonzalez, Clara Cid, Rudy Carrillo, (deceased), Angelo Alvarez (deceased), Xavier Tafoya, Bill Gee, Kenneth Segura Knoll, David Rasul, Melinda Santana, Rosemary Rasul, Sharon Loris, Richard Montoya, Pedro Hernandez, Freddie Rodriguez (deceased), Jennie Baca (deceased), Gloria Rangel (deceased), Irma Rangel, Rico Hernandez, Carlos “Stubbo” Portillo (deceased), Lupe Portillo Carrillo, Richard Rodriguez, Gloria and Gilbert Gamino, Albert Mestas (deceased), Jesse Ortiz-Ocelotl (deceased), Juanita Polendo, Ramon Ontiveros, Daniel de Los Reyes, Fast Eddie Salas, Sam Quiñones (deceased), Arturo Ruano Singh (deceased), Jose Rivera (Joey de D.Q.U.), Lucy Montoya, Gloria M. Galvin, Phillip "Pike" Santos, Juan Gonzalez, Joe Camacho (deceased), Junior Baca, "Mexico" Cid, Manuela Serna, Eva Serna, Eva C. García (deceased), Richard Rodriguez, and Manuel Caro.

== Northern Division of the RCAF ==
On the night of November 14, 2013, at the basement of Venti's bar (Salem Oregon), a meeting took place where Juanishi V. Orosco, using his power as general and founding member of the RCAF, recruited a number of people to form the North Division of the Royal Chicano Air Force.

The new members of the Northern Division of the RCAF were: Dalila Ortiz, Lázaro Ybarra, San Juana Acosta- González, Roberto Orán, Zoé Gibert, and Matías Trejo De Dios. Frederick A. Romero, member of the RCAF, was also present. The names of Emidio Lopez, Benjamín Bocanegra, Ingrid Fuentes, Erubiel Valladares Carranza II and Vicky Falcón Vázquez were added later to this list per Juanishi Orosco.
