= Chicana art =

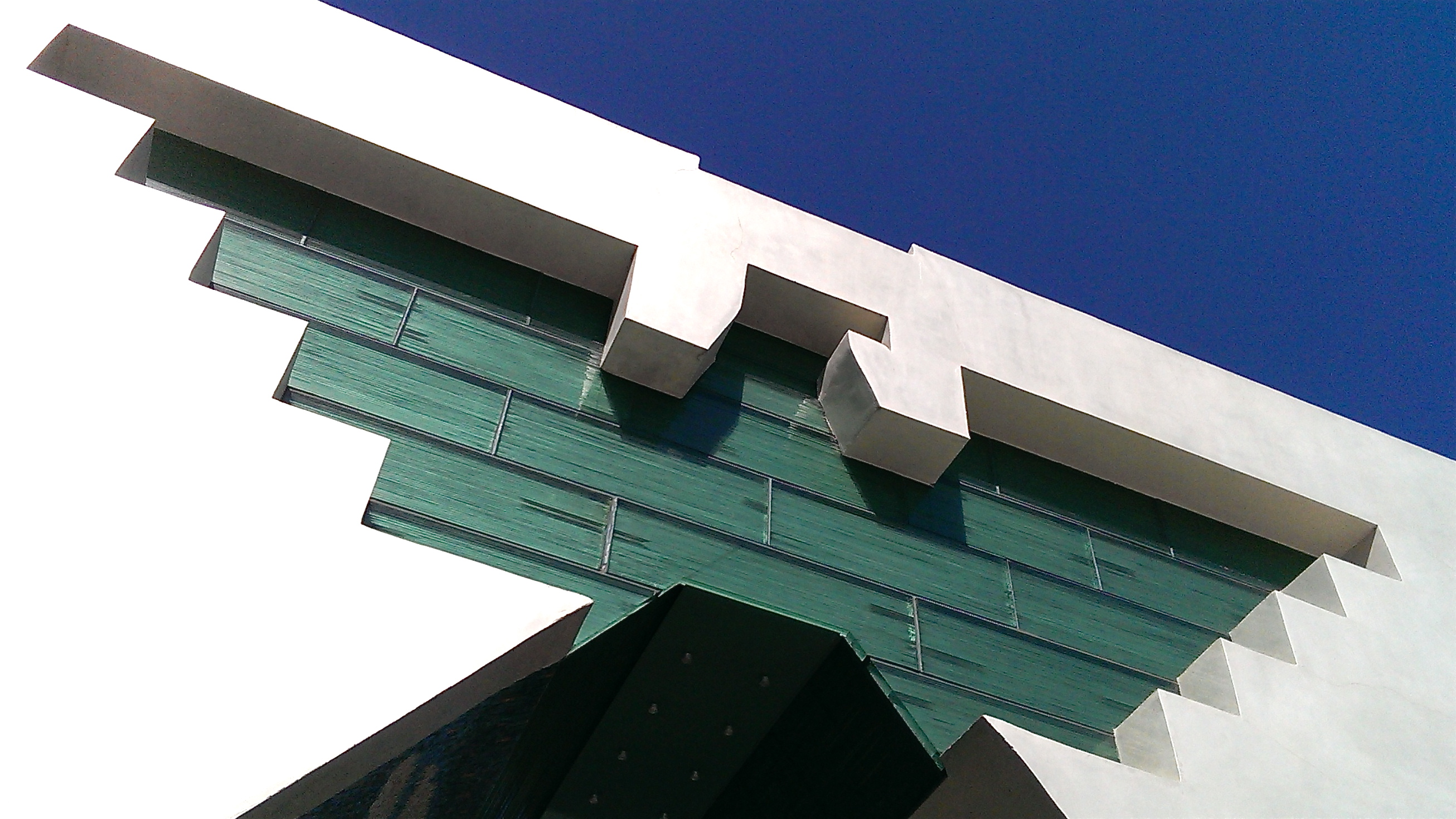
The Arch of Dignity, Equality, and Justice, by Judith F. Baca (2008)

Chicana art emerged as part of the Chicano Movement in the 1960s. It used art to express political and social resistance through different art mediums. Chicana artists explore and interrogate traditional Mexican-American values and embody feminist themes through different mediums such as murals, painting, and photography. The momentum created from the Chicano Movement spurred a Chicano Renaissance among Chicanas and Chicanos. Artists voiced their concerns about oppression and empowerment in all areas of race, gender, class, and sexuality. Chicana feminist artists and Anglo-feminist took a different approach in the way they collaborated and made their work during the 1970s. Chicana feminist artists utilized artistic collaborations and collectives that included men, while Anglo-feminist artists generally utilized women-only participants. Art has been used as a cultural reclamation process for Chicana and Chicano artists allowing them to be proud of their roots by combining art styles to illustrate their multi-cultured lives.

== The Woman's Building (1973–1991) ==
The Woman's Building opened in Los Angeles, California in 1973. In addition to housing women-owned businesses, the center held multiple art galleries and studio spaces. Women of color, including Chicanas, historically experienced racism and discrimination within the building from white feminists. Not many Chicana artists were allowed to participate in the Woman's Building's exhibitions or shows. Chicana artists Olivia Sanchez and Rosalyn Mesquite were among the few included. Additionally, the group Las Chicanas exhibited Venas de la Mujer in 1976.

=== Social Public Art Resource Center (SPARC) ===
In 1976, co-founders Judy Baca (the only Chicana), Christina Schlesinger, and Donna Deitch established the Social and Public Art Resource Center (SPARC). Judy Baca had noticed a lack of awareness toward women of color in her time in Venice, California and realized the difficulties as being a woman of color who is both a feminist and a Latina which prompted the creation of SPARC. It consisted of studio and workshop spaces for artists. SPARC functioned as an art gallery and also kept records of murals. SPARC was created to support youth in areas where gangs are prevalent, which is why community youth was involved in the making of The Great Wall of Los Angeles. The Great Wall of Los Angeles was the first project made by SPARC showcasing topics of erasure of ethnic groups in California and homophobia. SPARC provides deeper context in the omission of underrepresented communities and elicits the exclusion that happens in U.S. history. SPARC is still active and encourages a space for Chicana community collaboration in cultural and artistic campaigns.

=== Los Four ===
Gilbert Luján, Carlos Almaráz, along with Frank Romero and Robert de La Rocha, or "Beto de la Rocha" were the original members who came up with Los Four as their group name as a way to demonstrate the duality of being Chicano and their Chicano culture. In the 1970s, Los Four became a part of the Chicano movement showcasing their murals with political themes tied to them. Muralist Judithe Hernández joined the all-male art collective in 1974 as its fifth member. This was crucial at the time as they were trying to be inclusive and steer away gender roles they grew up knowing The group decided not to change the name of Los Four despite having five members because they had already gained popularity through the name Los Four. The collective was active in the 1970s through early 1980s.

== Street Art ==
=== Murals ===
Murals were the preferred medium of street art used by Chicana artists during the Chicano Movement. Murals became largely popular during El Movimiento in the 1970s as they were intended to bring people together. Judy Baca was the first Chicana to create a mural, Mi Abuelita, she led the large-scale project for SPARC, The Great Wall of Los Angeles. It took five summers to complete the 700 meter long mural. The mural was completed by Baca, Judithe Hernández, Olga Muñiz, Isabel Castro, Yreina Cervántez, and Patssi Valdez in addition to over 400 more artists and community youth. During the creation of The Great Wall of Los Angeles Baca started putting women in leadership roles and trying to get them to become involved in the making of the mural. Located in Tujunga Flood Control Channel in the Valley Glen area of the San Fernando Valley, the mural depicts California's erased history of marginalized people of color and minorities.

In 1989, Yreina Cervántez along with assistants Claudia Escobedes, Erick Montenegro, Vladimir Morales, and Sonia Ramos began the mural La Ofrenda, located in downtown Los Angeles. The mural, a tribute to Latina and Latino farm workers, features Dolores Huerta at the center with two women arched the history of Los Angeles and met with historians as she originally planned out the mural. The mural was halted after Carrasco refused alterations demanded from City Hall due to her depictions of formerly enslaved entrepreneur and philanthropist Biddy Mason, the internment of Japanese American citizens during World War II, and the 1943 Zoot Suit Riots.

=== Performance Art ===
Chicana entertainers have utilized the deconstructive qualities of performance art to challenge thought of character, identity, embodiment, and culture. Starting in the 1970s, Chicana artists began experimenting with street based performances that highlighted their unique role as cultural outsiders to white middle-class norms. Patssi Valdez was a member of the performance group Asco from the early 1970s to the mid-1980s. Asco's art spoke about the problems that arise from Chican@s unique experience residing at the intersection of racial, gender, and sexual oppression. Contemporary Chicana performance artists include Xandra Ibarra, Nao Bustamente, and Monica Palacios.

==== La Panza Monologues ====
The Panza Monologues is a performance art piece built around the narratives of Chicana women. The Panza Monologues were composed by Virginia Grise and Irma Mayorga and presented as a solo performance by Grise herself. This performance art piece strikingly puts the panza ('belly') in the spotlight as an image that uncovers bits of their insight, viewpoints, lives, loves, misuses, and individual battles. The piece was intended to spotlight something that most times women are made to feel like should be hidden, making it seem shameful, and as a reminder that body images can greatly influence a woman's life.

Xandra Ibarra is Chicana performance artist who coined the term spictacles as a way to describe her performances of Mexican iconography that reveal the ways they function as racist tropes within performance cultures.

== Photography ==
Laura Aguilar, known for her "compassionate photography," which often involved using herself as the subject of her work but also individuals who lacked representation in the mainstream: Chicanas, the LBGTQ community, and women of different body types. During the 1990s, Aguilar photographed the patrons of an Eastside Los Angeles lesbian bar. Aguilar utilized her body in the desert as the subject of her photographs wherein she manipulated it to look sculpted from the landscape. In 1990, Aguilar created Three Eagles Flying, a three-panel photograph featuring herself half nude in the center panel with the flag of Mexico and the United States of opposite sides as her body is tied up by the rope and her face covered. The triptych represents the imprisonment felt by the two cultures she belongs to. Laura Aguilar created a collection of work that accepts the human figure as its focal request. The best of her art is from her initial work, known as the Latina Lesbian Series, which started in 1987. The series comprises highly contrasting pictures of ladies who identified as Latina and lesbian. Photographs in this series frequently went with the woman's signature as well.

Delilah Montoya, a Chicana photographic artist, has an assortment of work that explores her interpretation of being a woman and understanding the world she had been placed in by incorporating the idea of mestizo, the combining of cultures. Montoya became politicized after her residency in South Omaha after the exposure of a multitudinous amount of cultures. Montoya made pieces deliberately to highlight the presence of the absent often inspired through the early years of the Chicano Movement. Further influences of the Civil Rights Movement allowed her to implore the idea of the reinvention of the self in terms of culture and history that encapsulates you.

== Modern Work ==
Though the Chicano movement has passed, Chicanas continue to use art as a way to uplift their perspectives and celebrate Chicana voices. Young Chicana artists like Diana Yesenia Alvarado, who works with sculpture, create art that represent their culture and get little recognition. New art forms have risen as technology has begun to play a more vital role in daily life as artists like Guadalupe Rosales use platforms like Instagram as a part of their work. Rosales uses her role as an artist and an archivist to artfully collect photos and magazines of Chicanas from the 1990s. She portrayed her own understanding of growing up Chicana in East Los Angeles, a predominantly Latino area. On her account Veteranas y Rucas, her photos depict men in baggy pants and women with teased hair making their way through a time of anti-immigrant sentiments and gang violence. What started as a way for Rosales' family to connect over their shared culture through posting images of Chican@s history and nostalgia soon grew to an archive dedicated to not only 1990s Chican@ youth culture but also as far back as the 1940s. Additionally, Rosales has created art installations to display the archive away from its original digital format and exhibited solo shows Echoes of a Collective Memory and Legends Never Die, A Collective Memory. Rosales is the recipient of a 2019 Gordon Parks Foundation Fellowship. She was the Los Angeles County Museum of Art's first Instagram artist in residence in 2017. Others like poet Felicia "Fe" Montes have gained popularity for their work in Chicana art for still other forms. Montes uses spoken word and slam traditions among other mediums to relate with her Latina following about identity. She reads her poetry in unconventional places and questions women's historically subservient and lower-serving roles than men. As she writes, she keeps the Chicano culture in Los Angeles in mind, through women's collectives like Mujeres de Maiz.

== Themes ==
=== La Virgen ===
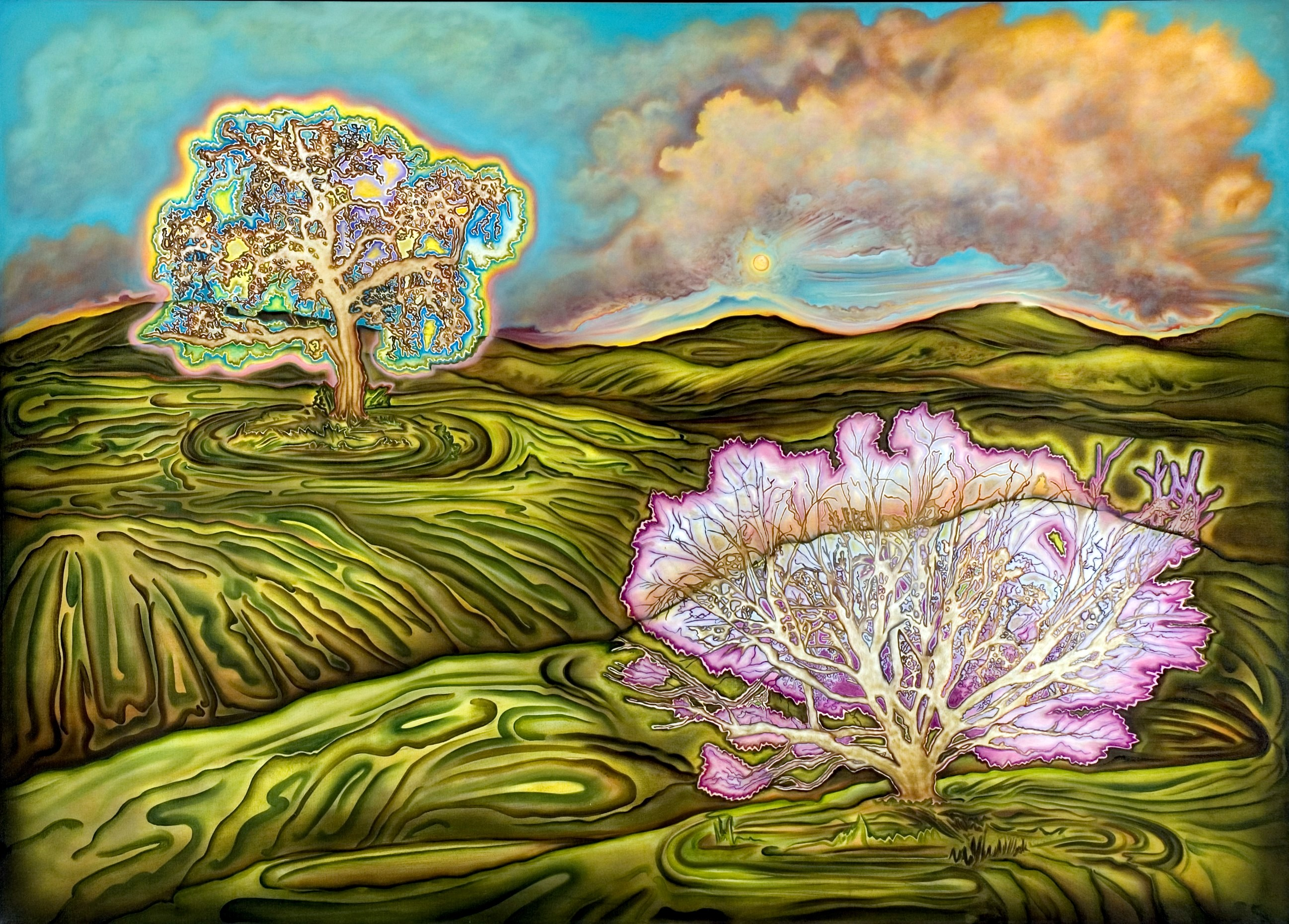
Linda Vallejo's Oaks on the Hillside, 2007

Over the years, la Virgen de Guadalupe has been used by Chicana artists to explore themes of repression and feminine strength. She has become a symbol through which artists have attempted to eradicate the stigmas facing women's place in society and ownership of their bodies. Alma López, Margarita "Mita" Cuaron, Yolanda López and Ester Hernandez are four Chicana feminist artists who used reinterpretations of La Virgen de Guadalupe to empower Chicanas. La Virgen as a symbol of the challenges Chicanas face as a result of the unique oppression they experience religiously, culturally, and through their gender.

==== Alma López ====
Alma López focuses on eradicating the stigmas surrounding women. She painted Our Lady in 1999, which portrays a modern Virgen de Guadalupe unclothed, supported by an unclothed "angel" with the wings of a monarch. La Virgen wears nothing but flowers, but stands powerfully with her hands at her hips and her face expressing confidence and seriousness. She has reimagined the traditional icon to explore the shamelessness she believes should stem from a woman of today who does not conform to the expectation of society. Especially since La Virgen is typically clothed from head to toe, this piece of art challenges the themes the original pushes forward, including modesty and subservience. She expresses the need for ownership of the indigenous body. Alma López also painted Lupe and Sirena in Love in 1999, which depicts the traditional Virgen de Guadalupe, nicknamed Lupe, lovingly embracing a mermaid. This is Alma López's commentary on Catholic Church teaching regarding sexuality and gender. She portrays a sacred individual romantically embracing another woman, directly challenging commonly followed beliefs that ostracize LGBTQ individuals. Alma López pushes the boundaries that confine the common woman, depicting La Virgen de Guadalupe in modern and controversial light as she paints. "Our Lady of Controversy: Alma Lopez's 'Irreverent Apparition'" (2011) demonstrates some of the angry responses she has received for her work. Irreverent Apparition is mixed media and is a sacrilegious depiction of La Virgen.

==== Margarita "Mita" Cuaron ====
Margarita “Mita” Cuaron’s most famous pieces of Our Lady of Guadalupe are Virgen de la Sandía (1996) and Virgen de Guadalupe Baby (1992). Virgen de Guadalupe Baby (1992) depicts La Virgen de Guadalupe as a baby surrounded by the womb, which is shaped by white, fluffy clouds and is surrounded by La Virgen’s typical yellow, sunlight rays and dark green garments. Within the child's clasped hands is a light red heart. Portraying both ideas of birth and regrowth, Cuaron focuses on a theme of new possibilities and formations. Cuaron’s painting, Virgen de Guadalupe Baby (1992) was recreated again in 2004 through a different kind of artistic medium, as a screen print. “In Nacimiento (2004) Cuaron depicts her first and only child swaddled in the protection of La Virgen's green mantle. She identifies the birth of her child and entry into motherhood as one of the most important moments in her life, extending gratitude to not only her child but birthers of new life everywhere.” Similarly, this print has similar color and design features to her original piece, Virgen de Guadalupe Baby (1992). In Cuaron's screen print, Virgen de la Sandía (1996), La Virgen de Guadalupe is depicted as a nude woman standing on a crescent–shaped moon at the center of the art piece. The disrobed religious figure is surrounded by a watermelon with red, orange, yellow, and white glow. Scholar, Teresa Eckmann's analysis of Cuaron's screen print, Virgen de la Sandía (1996), makes a reference to the “sexual metaphor of the sandia, or watermelon, as an image of women's genitalia.” Furthermore, this screen print was recreated in 1997, by using an alternative medium of watercolor paint. This new version of the piece, Virgen de la Sandía (1997) depicts La Virgen de Guadalupe fully clothed in a pink gown covered by her recognizable green mantle with golden sun rays. She is standing on a red crescent–shaped watermelon slice, instead of a crescent moon in the original piece of 1996.

==== Yolanda López ====
Like Alma Lopez, Yolanda López also focuses on themes of sexuality and the stigmas of women when she portrays La Virgen de Guadalupe. In her piece, "Love Goddess" from 1978, López merges the image of La Virgen with an image of Sandro Bottecelli's "The Birth of Venus" from the mid-1480s. She makes the commentary that Christian nature rejects the natural appearance of women's bodies by embracing the fact that at an even earlier age, the Greek mythology would embrace it without the shame and fear that has developed. López challenges the virginal image by eradicating the stigma and sin that are often associated; she infuses a sacred religious image with sexuality so as to celebrate it rather than be ashamed.

==== Ester Hernandez ====
Ester Hernández references the sacred Virgen de Guadalupe in her painting, La Ofrenda (1988). The painting recognizes lesbian love and challenges the traditional role of la familia. It defies the reverence and holiness of La Virgen by being depicted as a tattoo on a lesbian's back. She also painted La Virgen de Guadalupe Defendiendo los Derechos de Los Xicanos (1975).

=== Collective Memory and Correcting History ===
Chicano artists have used their art to educationally reaffirm the historical events and varied experiences in their communities that have been rewritten in time.

==== The Pocho Research Society of Erased and Invisible History ====
The Pocho Research Society of Erased and Invisible History was founded by Sandra de la Loza, the only known member in the organization, in Los Angeles in 2002. The Pocho Research Society of Erased and Invisible History had a goal of uncovering hidden or otherwise distorted aspects of Chicano history and celebrating the forgotten figures of the Chicano movement. Pocho is a negative slang term used to refer to Chicano and Chicanas, but the Research Society used pocho to name the perspectives of Mexicans shaped by the social impacts of living in the U.S.

== Notable Chicana Artists ==
- Alma López
- Amalia Mesa-Bains
- Barbara Carrasco
- Carmen Lomas Garza
- Celia Álvarez Muñoz
- Celia Herrera Rodriguez
- Consuelo Jimenez Underwood
- Delilah Montoya
- Diane Gamboa
- Ester Hernandez
- Isis Rodriguez
- Judy Baca
- Juana Alicia
- Kathy Vargas
- Laura Aguilar
- Laura E. Alvarez
- Laura Molina (artist)
- Margarita "Mita" Cuaron
- Marta Sánchez (artist)
- Patricia Rodriguez (artist)
- Rita Gonzalez
- Sandra de la Loza
- Santa Barraza
- Santa Contreras Barraza
- Yolanda López
- Yreina Cervantez

== Chicana Artist Groups ==
- Mujeres Muralistas
- Social and Public Art Resource Center
