= Bringing the Circle Together =

Former free film series in Los Angeles

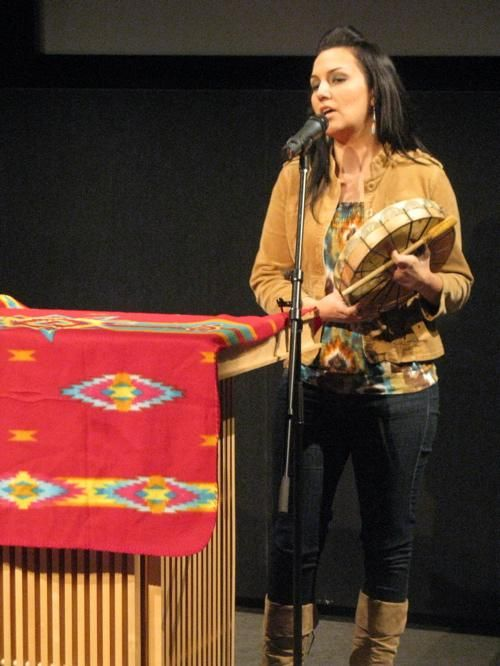
- Felicia Montes performs at Bringing the Circle Together.
- Genre: Native American, Indigenous, First Nation
- Dates: Monthly
- Location: Los Angeles, CA
- Years active: 2008–2012

Bringing the Circle Together was a free film series in downtown Los Angeles, by and about Native Americans. The series was held monthly from 2008 to 2012. It was co-hosted by Lorin Morgan-Richards Pamela J. Peters, and Koji Steven Sakai.

== Screenings and guests ==
2008

- May 15: The Buffalo War with musical guest the Removal Act (Janel Munoa)
- June 19: Kanehsatake: 270 Years of Resistance with musical guest Jamie Coon
- July 31: Black Indians: An American Story with guest poet Asani Charles and speaker Valena Broussard Dismukes
- August 14: In Whose Honor? with guest artist Tschetan
- September 11: Discovering Dominga with guests Azalea Ryckman and poet Daniel Morales Leon
- October 23: Aleut Story with guest author Marie Huskey
- November 20: Alcatraz is Not An Island with guest Dr. Troy R. Johnson
- December 4: Our Spirits Don't Speak English: Indian Boarding School with guest Felicia Montes and speaker Lorene Sisquoc

2009

- January 15: Kaho'olawe Aloha 'Aina, short Ancestor Eyes with filmmaker Kalani Queypo and musical artist Makana
- February 19: Whispers with guest filmmaker George Angelo Jr., special guest actor Saginaw Grant, and musical artists Apache and Heidi
- March 26: Finding Dawn with guest Tiger Moon
- April 16: Killer's Paradise, short Soleil with filmmakers Jessica McMunn and Emmanuel Macias, guest artist Ana Castillo and speaker Diana Flores
- May 7: Walk Like a Warrior: The Apache Skateboard Story with filmmakers Douglas Miles and Franck Boistel and poet Mark Gonzalez
- June 18: Quest of the Carib Canoe with guest artist Kantuta and Garifuna speaker Cheryl Noralez
- July 16: When Your Hands are Tied with guest The Prophecy
- August 20: In Search of History: Navajo Code Talkers with guest poet Karina Dominguez, speaker Blase Bonpane and speaker Zonnie Gorman.
- October 15: Looking Toward Home with guest Timo and the White Buffalo
- November 19: Trespassing with filmmakers Susana Lagudis and Carlos DeMenezes
- December 17: Warrior: The Life of Leonard Peltier with guest speakers Ben Carnes, Anne Begay, Kathy Peltier and Gray Wolf

2010

- January 14: The Ghost Riders with filmmaker V. Blackhawk Aamodt and artist Annette Phoenix, and actor Saginaw Grant
- February 25: Lost Nation: The Ioway with filmmakers Tammy and Kelly Rundle. This event marked a historic meeting between the Tongva and Southern Ioway and Northern Ioway. Tongva delegates included Tribal Chairman Anthony Morales, Andy Morales, and Gloria Arellanes. Southern Ioway in attendance included Tribal Elder Joyce Big Soldier Miller, 2010 Ioway Tribal Princess Shayla Scott Miller, Tribal Pow Wow Chairman Bob Murray, Jr., Bear Murray, Tribal members: Jimmy Rowe, Marlina Rowe, Celina Rowe, Jimena Rowe, Viento Rowe, Richard Ornelas, Brittney Rowe, Ilisewa Rowe, Wasoce Rowe, Jeriah Rowe and Richard Ornelas. Northern Ioway in attendance included Annie Barada Assefa, Sarita McGowan, Tommy McGowan, Johnny McGowan, Christa McGowan, Sarah Barada James, Naoni Padilla, Michele McCord (award-winning songwriter for country music stars).
- March 18: Juchitan Queer Paradise, short Two-Spirit People in the Modern World with guest speakers Michelle Enfield, Elton Naswood, and Bamby Salcedo. Event was cosponsored by AIDS Project LA and Red Circle Project
- April 22: Broken Rainbow with filmmaker Victoria Mudd and speaker Paul Apodaca
- May 29: Asian Pacific Islander-Native American Heritage Festival: Crossing the Rainbow Bridge: Our Story with filmmaker Kat High and guests including Kawalea Polynesian Dance Group
- September 18: Ixoq hosted by Azalea Ryckman, musical guests Princesas del Mundo Maya, and filmmakers Felipe Perez and IxchelMultimedia
- November 11: Two Spirits in partnership with Red Circle Project in collaboration with Aids Project LA
- November 19: A Good Day to Die, in partnership with LA Skins Fest

2012

- January 25: For the Rights of All: Ending Jim Crow in Alaska with guest artist Elizabeth Zangenberg
- February 22: American Red and Black: Stories of Afro-Native Identity, short Picking Tribes with filmmaker S. Pearl Sharp. Guests Valena Broussard Dismukes, Karen Chappelle, Billie Frierson, Richard Procello and Dr. Horace Williams
- March 21: From the Badlands to Alcatraz, hosted by Pamela J. Peters
- May 12: Act of War: The Overthrow of the Hawaiian Nation

== See also ==
- Pan-Indianism
