= Marta Sánchez (artist) =

American artist

Marta Sánchez (born 1959) is a Chicana painter known for her retablos paintings, works on paper such as serigraphs and monotypes, and cascarones. She currently teaches at the Philadelphia Museum of Art, Saint Joseph's University, and the Springside Chestnut Hill Academy.

== Early life and education ==
Marta Sánchez was born in San Antonio, Texas. As a child, she lived in poverty and faced discrimination for her Chicana heritage. As a result, she turned to art as a defense against what she faced. Ultimately, Sánchez used art as a means of social activism. She later went on to acquire a BFA in art education at the University of Texas at Austin. Motivated by the opportunity to study abroad in Italy, Sánchez joined the MFA program at the Tyler School of Art in Philadelphia.

At UT Austin, Sánchez met Santa Barraza, a fellow artist who familiarized Sánchez with the Chicano Movement. Sánchez was heavily inspired by the Mexican religious retablos paintings she saw in Italy. Retablos, or ex-votos, are small tin paintings that pay respect to different saints of the Catholic Church, symbolizing a positive future and spiritual journey in the Mexican experience. The message of looking towards the future and finding one's spiritual self greatly inspired Sánchez to want to discover her own personal, religious journey through art. She saw retablos as a form of self and religious discovery, social activism, and a connection with her Mexican heritage. Today, Sánchez is known mainly for her retablos paintings.

== Social activism ==
The Philadelphia Folklore Project highlights Sánchez's role as a social activist in that she uses her love for art as a means of social awareness around HIV/AIDS. In 1992, Sánchez founded "Cascarones Por La Vida Art Fund", a Philadelphia based organization that promotes the well-being of young individuals diagnosed with HIV/AIDS. Incorporating her love for arts with her passion for social activism, Sánchez recruits different artists and young people in Philadelphia to come together and create colorful confetti-filled eggs called cascarones, to which they sell and donate the proceeds towards fighting HIV/AIDS. Sánchez notes that she started this organization as a way of spreading unconditional love and warmth to everyone, just as they do in her Hispanic heritage.

== Art ==
- La Danza (1994)
  - Sánchez's art piece La Danza, reflects elements of retablo, while also reflecting stories of Sánchez's happy childhood memories. The art piece depicts Sánchez as a ghost posed like a Madonna-and-child portrait, with images of retablo surrounding her. Also surrounding Sánchez are various memories from her childhood such as her home, family, and trains. The painting incorporates elements of nature such as green leaves and flowers that outline Sánchez 's ghostly body, reflecting the bright future of retablo. Reflecting her struggle against poverty, the distorted vegetation in the background of the piece is silenced by her happy childhood memories.
  - When describing "La Danza," Sánchez notes that traditionally, the piece is a type of badge for her ability to overcome poverty, while at the same time functions as a tribute to her family, rather than a Catholic saint. Like many other Chicana artists, Sánchez turns to art as a platform for "reclaiming the religious world and transforming it into contemporary spirituality" while also, "creat[ing] artistic spaces that unify personal healing with cultural resistance" (Romo 30).
- Train Yards
  - Recently, Sánchez produced a series of paintings depicting the significance and importance of trains during the Mexican Migration experience. Her admiration for trains has dated back to when she was a child, as she lived near the San Antonio train yards and would admire the trains as they passed.
- Carpas Series
  - In her Carpas series of paintings, Sánchez pays tribute to her great-grandfather who was a lion trainer during the Carpas era. He would travel all over Mexico with a circus, until he died from a lion attack.
- Cascarones Inspired Paintings
  - Currently, Sánchez is working on a recipes series, specifically one focused on cooking eggs, in reflection of her love for cascarones. The series will be an artistic expression of her Chicana heritage.

Partnered with actor and comedian Cheech Marin, Sánchez's work has been part of the "Chicano Visions: American Artist on the Verge" traveling show.
