= Cuarón (surname) =

Cuarón is a Spanish surname. People with this name include:

- Alfonso Cuarón Orozco (born 1961), Mexican film director, screenwriter, producer, and editor
- Alicia Cuarón (born 1939), Mexican-American educator and human rights activist
- Carlos Cuarón (born 1966), Mexican screenwriter, brother of Alfonso Cuarón Orozco
- Jonás Cuarón (born 1981), Mexican film director, son of Alfonso Cuarón Orozco
- Ralph Cuarón (1923–2002), Chicano communist organizer and leader
