= Alma López =

Mexican artist (born 1966)

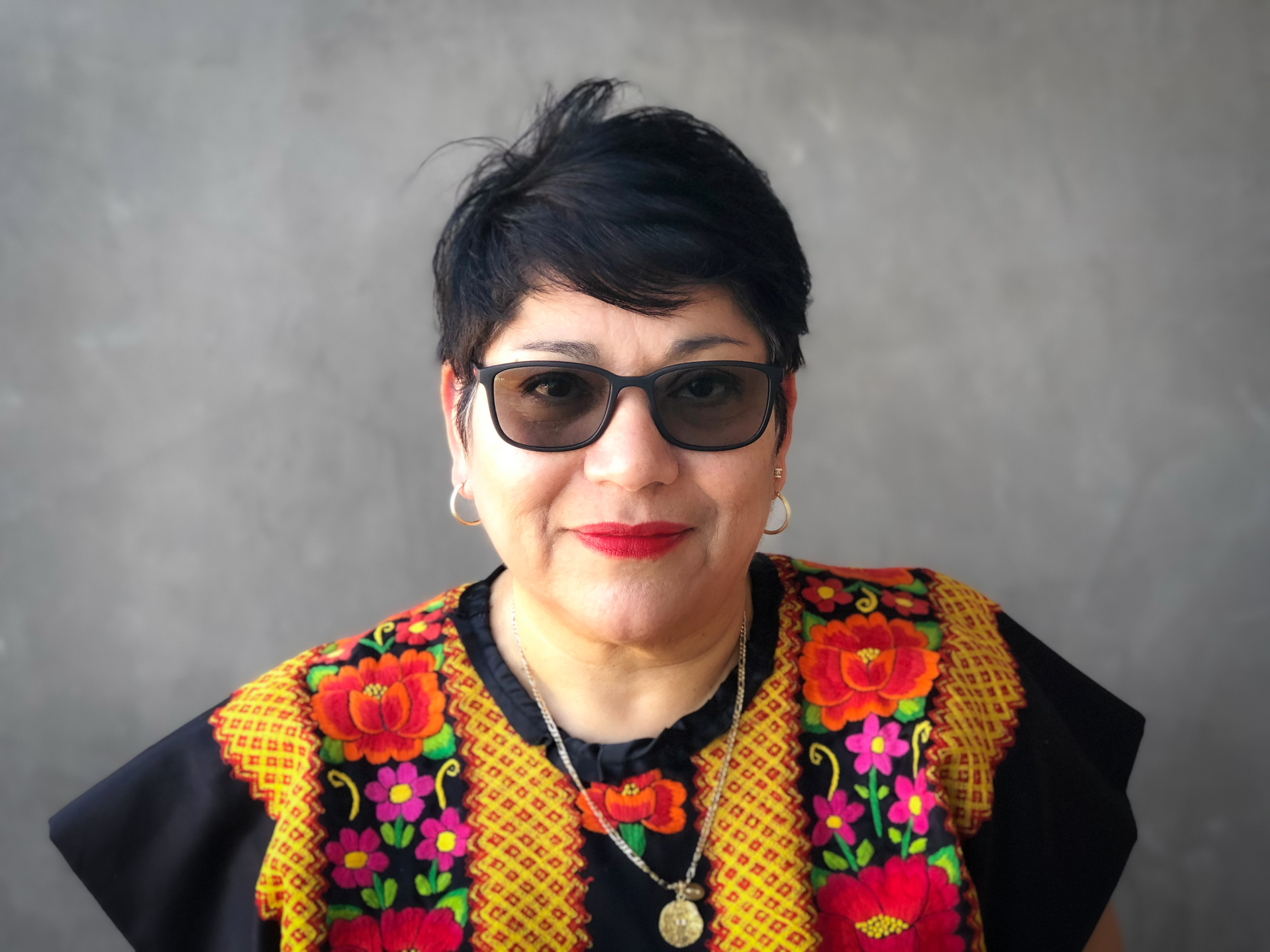
- Born: 1966; Sinaloa, Mexico
- Education: MFA from University of California Irvine, BA from University of California Santa Barbara
- Notable work: Our Lady, 1999; Heaven 2, 2000; La Llorona Desperately Seeking Coyolxauhqui, 2003; Coyolxauhqui Returns Disguised as Our Lady of Guadalupe Defending the Rights of Las Chicanas, 2004
- Movement: Chicana
- Spouse: Alicia Gaspar de Alba
- Website: www.almalopez.com

Alma López (born 1966) is a Mexican-born Queer Chicana artist. Her art often portrays historical and cultural Mexican figures, such as the Virgin of Guadalupe and La Llorona, filtered through a radical Chicana feminist lesbian lens. Her art work is meant to empower women and indigenous Mexicans by the reappropriation of symbols of Mexica history when women played a more prominent role. The medium of digital art allows her to mix different elements from Catholicism and juxtapose it to indigenous art, women, and issues such as rape, gender violence, sexual marginalization and racism. This juxtaposition allows her to explore the representation of women and indigenous Mexicans and their histories that have been lost or fragmented since colonization. Her work is often seen as controversial. Currently, she is a lecturer at the University of California Los Angeles in the Department of Chicana/o Studies.

== Life and education ==
She was born in Los Mochis, Sinaloa and is married to novelist and poet Alicia Gaspar de Alba.

Alma López's family moved from Los Mochis, Sinaloa, Mexico to Los Angeles when she was young.

López grew up visiting Mexico since their move and the influence of the Virgin Mary was something she saw in her life. Alongside the image of the Virgin Mary much of the culture from both sides of the border influenced López in the development of her artwork.

López holds a BA from UC Santa Barbara, an MFA from UC Irvine, and a Photography Certificate from UCLA Extension.

== Academic Career ==
Alma López has been recognized for her teaching and mentorship at UCLA, where she has led courses in Chicana/o Studies and LGBTQ Studies that explore queer visual culture, censorship, and Chicana feminist art. In her teaching, she emphasizes the importance of seeing and sharing different cultures and identities in art, especially for queer and Chicana/o communities. These ideas are also discussed extensively by scholars when they study her art. At UCLA, she launched the “Queer Arts Wikipedia Research Project,” an initiative in which students researched and wrote Wikipedia biographies of underrepresented queer and Chicana/o artists. Students in these classes created over 70 biographies, helping to document artists whose stories had been missing from Wikipedia and other public archives. López describes the project as “information activism,” designed to bring greater visibility to overlooked artists and broaden access to queer art history. She has also guided collaborative public art projects, including the 2014 Black Cat Tavern mural, which she created with students from her “Queer Art in LA” course.

== Works ==
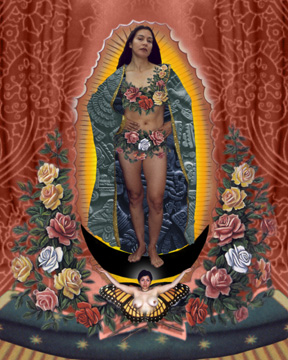
Our Lady (1999) by Alma López.

=== Our Lady ===
Our Lady is a photo-based digital print that depicts Raquel Salinas, a performance artist, confidently staring back at the viewer, wearing a bikini of roses. In the image, below the mandala of the virgen there is a nude butterfly angel that depicts Raquel Gutierrez. The roses allude to the Virgin of Guadalupe's origin myth, though her posture and eye contact defies the traditional version of the Virgin. Her cloak is covered in images of Coyolxauhqui, the Aztec moon goddess. The juxtaposition of Catholicism iconography and indigenous goddess reference the suppression of indigenous female goddess by Catholicism and Our Lady is contemporary Chicanas re-appropriating both.

López views her work as empowering to women and indigenous Mexicans. To López, La Virgen de Guadalupe is more than a religious symbol. She is a public figure and a symbol of her culture, community and family. La Virgen also served as symbols in art work for the Chicano Movement and the Women's Liberation Movement in Mexico which López cites as further support that La Virgen is not only a religious symbol.

The women photographed for the piece was motivated to model for it to reclaim her body and heal after being raped. She practices an indigenous spirituality that considers La Virgen de Guadalupe to be Tonantzin, or mother earth.

==== Controversy ====
In 2001 Our Lady was included in an exhibit called Cyber Arte: Tradition Meets Technology at the Museum of International Folk Art in Santa Fe, New Mexico. Controversy ensued. The New Mexico Archbishop Michael J. Sheehan referred to López's Virgin as a “tart or streetwoman.” However, the overt female homoeroticism remained largely absent from the controversy.

In response to this protest López said that Our Lady is not about sex or sexuality, but instead about showing strong women and the real lives of Chicanas. The curator of the exhibit and López received verbal and physical threats. Some of the responses to the work were homophobic, stating that the image of La Virgen did not belong to a queer feminist like López. López collected and posted the content of many of the threatening and supporting emails at her website. The controversy essentially became a part of the art piece itself.

Following the controversy and the protest at many showings of Our Lady, López wrote a book entitled Our Lady of Controversy: Irreverent Apparition.

=== Heaven 2 Mural ===
Heaven 2 was a mural displayed outside Galería de la Raza from November 2000 to January 2001. It portrays a woman on her deathbed thinking of herself and her lover holding hands on the moon. It was defaced with Bible verses and the gallery staff received homophobic threats and a gunshot through their window.

=== Lupe and Sirena in Love/Lupe and Sirena in the Sky with Angels ===
Lupe and Sirena in Love is a 1999 digital mixed media print depicting the Virgin of Guadalupe and La Sirena, from the Loteria game, embracing each other. López has acknowledged the butterfly below the two figures in the composition to be both a Monarch butterfly and a Viceroy butterfly.

=== La Historia de Adentro/La Historia de Afuera Mural ===
La Historia de Adentro/La Historia de Afuera was a mural painted by Yrenia Cervántez and Alma López on the Huntington Beach Art Center in 1995 as part of the center's inaugural exhibition. The mural used elements of water and waves as it showed the local history of people of color. Under the lead of Naida Osline and HBAC, the artists intended for the work to add visibility to the diversity of the community and their history. All of the models included in the work were local residents known for or related to someone affected by local historical events.

The contract with HBAC for the mural was only through 2000. In 2008, due to being vandalized in a way that could not be removed without damaging the mural, the new owners of the building decided to paint over it. Various Chicanx art scholars and community leaders attempted to save the mural, likening the destruction as the "equivalent to painting over the work of Diego Rivera," but the mural was ultimately lost. All that remains of the original mural are the ceramic tiles along the wall that were near the bottom of the composition.

=== La Llorona Desperately Seeking Coyolxauhqui ===
This piece is part of a 2003 series using similar titles and the same model. It depicts a close up of a young woman staring straight at the viewer and crying, alluding to La Llorona. Behind her is the silhouette of La Virgen with arms raised and her back to the young woman. People have suggested that La Virgen has turned her back on the young woman or is pleading for a female goddess or mourning a violated young women—alluding to La Llorona. Tattooed on the young woman's shoulder is the severed head of Coyolxauhqui and Coatlicue's fangs are stenciled over the young woman's face.

=== Coyolxauhqui Returns Disguised as Our Lady of Guadalupe Defending the Rights of Las Chicanas ===
The title of this piece refers to Ester Hernandez's 1976 sketch of a karate Lady of Guadalupe entitled La Virgen de Guadalupe Defending the Rights of the Xicanos. López's choice to use Las Chicanas instead of Hernandez's Los Xicanos conveys her focus on Mexican women. The subject of the painting is a middle-age, pregnant, indigenous women holding up one hand and a sword in her other hand. A halo on her head represents both La Virgen and Coyolxauhqui. Her hand held up suggests she is trying to stop an injustice. The sword pointing downward suggests she prefers peaceful discussion over violence, but like Coyolxauhqui and La Llorona, she will use violence to protect women.

=== La Briosa y la Medusa ===
La Briosa y la Medusa was inspired by Lucha Libre, which López had grown up watching. This piece focuses on female luchadores, specifically La Medusa and La Briosa, who López had found in her research on luchadoras. López saw the story of Alicia Alvarado, La Medusa, who herself had been inspired by a tag team match of luchadoras to become a wrestler herself. López saw these women in a male dominated sport like lucha libre and wanted to display the lesser known presence of women. Something which she herself believed that young people should see and that is the inclusion of women throughout male dominated history and events.

=== UCLA mural ===
In 2014 she and her students from her "Queer Art In LA" class at UCLA painted a mural in the LGBTQ studies offices. The mural shows the queer community and their allies protesting the police raids of the Black Cat Tavern.

== Awards and honors ==
- 1998 City of Los Angeles (COLA) Individual Artist Grant
- 1998 Brody Emerging Visual Artist Grant, California Community Foundation
- 1999 Premio Pollock-Siqueiros Binacional
- 2002 Arts Funding Initiative Visual Arts Mid Career Grant, California Community Foundation
- 2004 Astraea Lesbian Foundation for Justice Visual Artist Grant
- 2005 Outstanding Community Activist, Los Angeles LGBT Center
- 2005 Durfee Foundation's Artist Resource Completion Grant
- 2009 UC Regents' Lecturer, UCLA Department of Art History and the Cesar E. Chavez Department of Chicana/o Studies
- 2011 UCLA Diversity Program for Innovative Courses in Undergraduate Education, Cesar E. Chavez Department of Chicana/o Studies
- 2012 UCLA Diversity Program for Innovative Courses in Undergraduate Education, LGBT Studies Program
- 2013 UCLA Diversity Program Student's Choice LGBT Outstanding Faculty Award
- 2013 Richard T. Castro Distinguished Visiting Professorship, Metropolitan State University, Denver, Colorado
- 2018 Faculty Research Grant, UCLA Academic Senate's Council on Research
