= Mita Cuaron =

American artist and social activist (born 1952)

Margarita “Mita” Cuaron (born in 1952) is a Chicana curator, visual artist, social activist, educator, and a registered nurse. Born and raised in East Los Angeles, Cuaron utilizes a range of mediums in her artworks such as screen printing, printmaking, watercolor, mixed media, paper mache and more. Margarita “Mita” Cuaron was an active participant in the Chicano Movement and in the 1968 “blowouts” in East Los Angeles schools of the L.A. Unified School District.

== Early life and education ==
Margarita “Mita” Cuaron’s father, Ralph Cuaron immigrated to the United States in the late 1880’s from Chihuahua, Mexico. Ralph Cuaron and his family initially settled in Arizona and eventually immigrated to Los Angeles, working as day laborers in the Southwest. Margarita “Mita” Cuaron’s mother, Sylvia Cuaron and her family came from Ukraine. Traveling with several other extended family members during the pogroms in the late 19th century, Sylvia Cuaron and her family became store merchants in Brooklyn, New York, and eventually moved to Los Angeles.

== Activism ==
In 1968, Margarita Mita" Cuaron was a fifteen-year-old sophomore at Garfield High School in East Los Angeles. Cuaron helped organize nearly 22,000 students, mostly of Mexican-American background, who participated in the 1968 East Los Angeles, Chicanx Student Walkout demanding better teachers, smaller classes, and equal opportunity in higher education. As a result, Cuaron was arrested, suspended, and dropped out of Garfield High School.

== Artworks ==
Many of Margarita “Mita” Cuaron’s artworks were deeply inspired by Our Lady of Guadalupe and viewed the religious figure as a very strong, very empowering, spiritual figure in her life. Cuaron’s most famous pieces of Our Lady of Guadalupe are Virgen de la Sandía (1996) and Virgen de Guadalupe Baby (1992).

=== Virgen de Guadalupe Baby ===
Margarita “Mita” Cuaron’s painting, Virgen de Guadalupe Baby (1992) depicts Our Lady of Guadalupe as a sleeping, curled-up, pale infant clutching a small, light red heart. The infant is surrounded by a blue mantle with golden sun rays that eventually becomes a womb that shelters and protects the child. White, fluffy clouds surround the infant and is supported by the recognizable winged angel usually seen at the feet of La Virgen de Guadalupe. The backdrop of the painting has a light purple setting. Portraying both ideas of birth and regrowth, Cuaron focuses on a theme of new possibilities and formations.

Cuaron’s painting, Virgen de Guadalupe Baby (1992) was recreated again in 2004 through a different kind of artistic medium, as a screen print. According to the article, Agency, Accessibility, and Abolition–Exploring Reproductive Justice, by Starlina Sanchez, “In Nacimiento (2004) Cuaron depicts her first and only child swaddled in the protection of La Virgen's green mantle. She identifies the birth of her child and entry into motherhood as one of the most important moments in her life, extending gratitude to not only her child but birthers of new life everywhere.” Mary Erickson and her article, Crossing Borders in Search of Self, explains that “At an early age, Cuaron interpreted [La Virgen’s] image as a symbol of passivity or even alienation.” Cuaron wrote: “On the event of my 40th birthday, I experienced the birth of my first child and recognized a surge of new energy, creativity, spirituality, and remembrances of Guadalupe. I created my first image enshrining the birth of my children with her robes. This began an ongoing thread of ideas as my imagination explored new realisms of incorporating Guadalupe in my daily life as a woman, a mother, and as an artist.”

=== Virgen de la Sandía ===
Completely disrobed, Our Lady of Guadalupe is depicted as a nude woman centered in this screen print. The religious figure is surrounded by a watermelon with red, orange, yellow, and white glow. Teresa Eckmann’s analysis of Cuaron's screen print, Virgen de la Sandía (1996), in Chicano Artists and Neo-Mexicanists: (De) Constructions of National Identity describes that “Here the artist clearly makes reference to the sexual metaphor of the sandia, or watermelon, as an image of women's genitalia.” The bronze Virgen is standing on a crescent–shaped object of what appears to be a peach colored moon. Surrounding the scene is a midnight blue sky with golden stars.

The screen print, Virgen de la Sandía (1996) was created again in 1997 by using an alternative art medium of watercolor paint. Margarita “Mita” Cuaron’s new version of the piece, Virgen de la Sandía (1997) depicts Our Lady of Guadalupe fully clothed in a pink gown covered by her recognizable green mantle with golden sun rays. She is standing on a red crescent–shaped watermelon slice and the backdrop behind the religious figure is blue.

=== Colores del Muerte ===
This screen print (1996) portrays a smiling calavera, also known as a skull, with bright red lips on the right side of the print. The background of this print is made up of wavy curves of pink, red, yellow, black, and blue colors.

=== Birth of My Grandmother ===
On December 12, 2009, the Avenue 50 Studio Inc. presented Mita’s painting, Birth of My Grandmother, within the exhibition, “Testimonies Two-Contemporary Ex Votos,” in Los Angeles, California. Curator, Raoul De la Sota, assembled a group of artists for a special exhibit focusing on the Mexican-rooted art form of the ex-voto, including Margarita Mita Cuaron. The text at the bottom of the painting reads: “My great-grandparents Rafael and Geromina Salcido lived in the state of Chihuahua, known as old Mexico. Rafael worked in the copper mines for long periods of time. Geromina was alone when she went into labor with her second child and climbed a mule leading to Juarez, giving birth to my grandmother Micaela, May 8, 1888.”

=== Dreaming ===
This black, white, and gray-shaded drawing depicts a woman laying down, with her left hand across her chest, and her right hand over her head. There appears to be a red skeleton on top of the woman’s drawn image.

=== La Vida, Días para Nacimiento, Amor y Morir ===
This watercolor painting depicts a woman’s side profile facing a variety of photographs. Some of the objects of the photographs appear to be a skull, birth, and a heart.

=== Pulse of Life–Bite of Death ===
This watercolor painting depicts a pregnant woman holding her palms together and appears to be crying. The backdrop consists of various colors such as red, blue, and white.

=== (No Title) (1994) ===
Image consists of a multitude of calaveras in different colors with different designs under a full moon. This screen print depicts various colored calaveras, otherwise known as skulls, and a black backdrop.
