= Alicia Gaspar de Alba =

American critic & writer (born 1958)

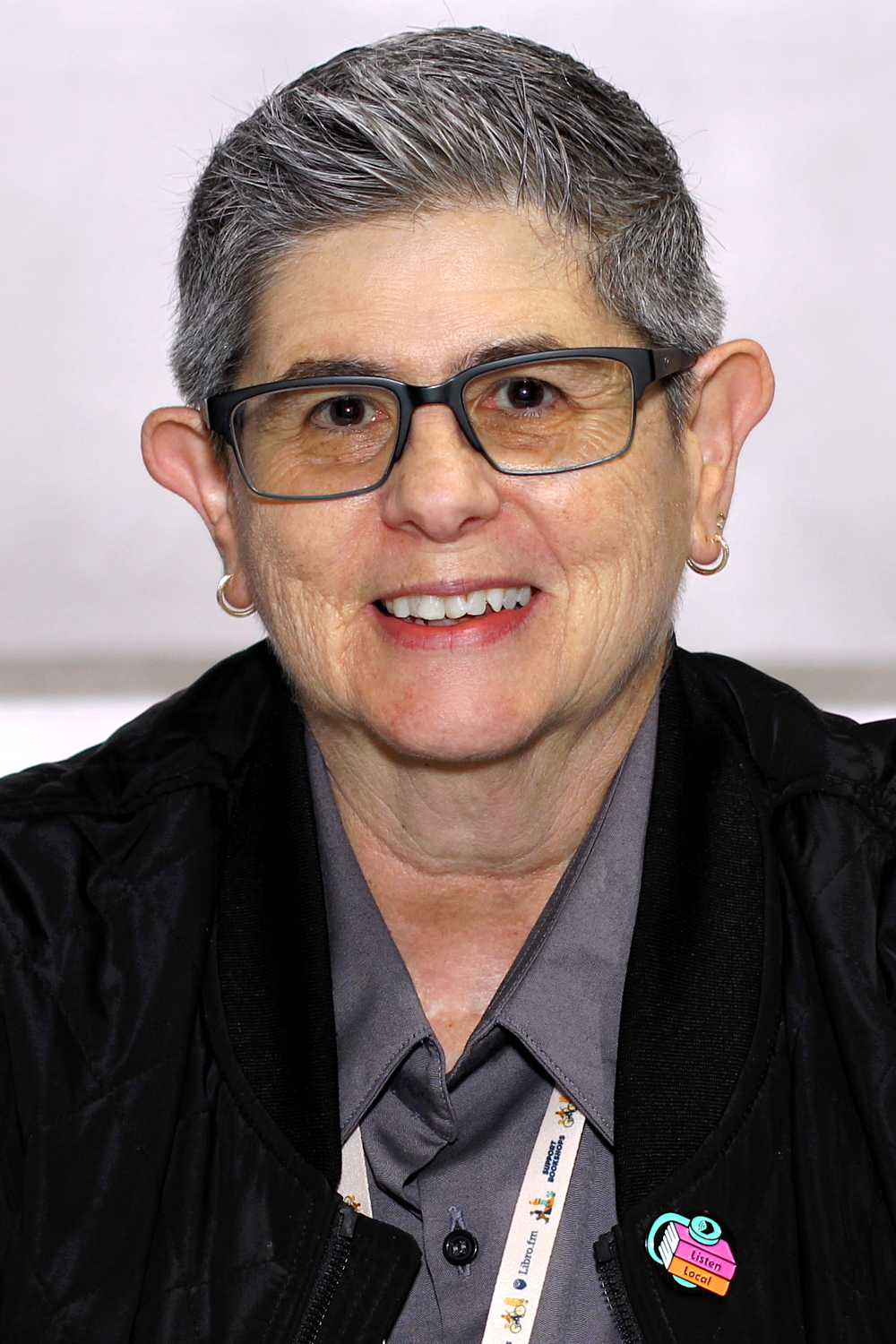
- Gaspar de Alba at the 2023 Texas Book Festival
- Born: July 29, 1958 (age 68); El Paso, Texas, U.S.
- Occupations: Scholar and writer
- Employer: University of California, Los Angeles
- Spouse: Alma López (m. 2008)

Academic work
- Discipline: Chicana and Chicano studies, English, gender and sexuality studies
- Main interests: Juárez femicides, Sor Juana Inés de la Cruz, bilingual storytelling
- Notable works: Desert Blood, Calligraphy of the Witch, Sor Juana's Second Dream
- Website: aliciagaspardealba.net

Alicia Gaspar de Alba is an American scholar, cultural critic, novelist, and poet whose works include historical novels and scholarly studies on Chicana/o art, culture and sexuality.

== Life ==
Gaspar de Alba was born on July 29, 1958, in El Paso, Texas, near its border with Ciudad Juárez. She earned a Bachelor of Arts in 1980 and a Master of Arts in 1983 in English from the University of Texas at El Paso, and a Ph.D. in American Studies in 1994 from the University of New Mexico. Her doctoral dissertation "Mi Casa [No] Es Su Casa: The Cultural Politics of Chicano Art" won the 1994 Ralph Henry Gabriel American Studies Association Award for best dissertation in the field.

Gaspar de Alba is married to artist Alma López.

== Career ==
Since 1994, she has taught in the Chicana/o Studies department at UCLA, where she offers classes on border consciousness, bilingual creative writing, Chicana Lesbian literature, barrio popular culture, femicide in Ciudad Juárez, and graduate courses on Chicana feminist theory.

In 1994, she was one of six founding faculty members of the then César Chávez Center for Interdisciplinary Instruction in Chicana and Chicano Studies at University of California, Los Angeles, now renamed the Department of Chicana/o and Central American Studies. Gaspar de Alba served as chair of that department from 2007 to 2010 and wrote the proposal for a Ph.D. program in Chicana/o Studies at UCLA, which accepted its first cohort in 2012. Gaspar de Alba chaired the UCLA LGBTQ Studies Program from 2013-2019, where she implemented QScholars, an annual queer undergraduate research symposium, and Queer Cats: A Journal of LGBTQ Studies, the first queer eScholarship journal at UCLA.

== Notable works ==
Gaspar de Alba's historical novel Sor Juana's Second Dream (1999) won the Latino Literary Hall of Fame Award for Best Historical Novel in 2000. In 2000, the book was translated into Spanish and published as El Segundo Sueño by Grijalbo Mondadori, and in 2001 Krug and Schadenberg published the German translation, Sor Juana's Zweiter Traum. In 2003, the novel was adapted to a stage play, The Nun and the Countess by Odalys Nanin. Juana, an opera based on the novel, had its world premiere by Opera UCLA in November 2019, the music composed by Carla Lucero and the libretto co-written by Lucero and Gaspar de Alba. In its review of Juana, the Los Angeles Times entertainment and arts reviewer described the opera as "a loving portrait of Juana and her inner struggles with sexuality and liberation." Gaspar de Alba's second historical novel, Calligraphy of the Witch, a Chicana gothic retelling of the New England witchcraft trials, was published by St. Martin's Press in 2007, and was reissued in paperback in 2012 by Arte Público Press. She has also published two hybrid collections, La Llorona on the Longfellow Bridge: Poetry y Otras Movidas (2003) and Crimes of the Tongue: Essays and Stories (2023), two academic books, a mystery novel, two collections of short fiction, and three anthologies.

Gaspar de Alba's creative and scholarly works have won several awards. Her 2005 novel Desert Blood: The Juárez Murders won the Lambda Literary Award for Best Lesbian Mystery Novel and the Latino Book Award for Best Mystery Novel. Desert Blood is based on Gaspar de Alba's empirical research on the femicides in Ciudad Juárez, the unresolved sexual murders of hundreds of Mexican women and girls along the border in El Paso, Texas, the region where Gaspar de Alba is originally from. Based on this research, she taught several research seminars on the femicides, wrote a policy brief that was published by the UCLA Chicano Studies Research Center, edited an anthology titled Making a Killing: Femicide, Free Trade, and La Frontera, and organized an international conference, "The Maquiladora Murders, Or, Who Is Killing the Women of Juárez?" in 2003, which was co-sponsored by Amnesty International.

In 2015, her book, [Un]Framing the "Bad Woman": Sor Juana, Malinche, Coyoylxauhqui and Other Rebels With a Cause, a collection of essays Gaspar de Alba published in the first twenty years of her academic career, won the American Association of Hispanics in Higher Education (AAHHE) Best Book Award.

Her work has been published in several languages and focuses primarily on gender and sexuality. The Alicia Gaspar de Alba Papers are housed at the Nettie Lee Benson Latin American Collection at the University of Texas Libraries.

== Awards ==
- AAHHE Book Award for [Un]Framing the "Bad Woman" (2015)
- International Latino Book Award for Spanish Translation of Desert Blood, Sangre en el desierto (trans. Rosario Sanmiguel) (2009)
- Gold Shield Faculty Prize for Academic Excellence (UCLA) 2008
- Lambda Literary Award for Best Lesbian Mystery for Desert Blood (2005)
- International Latino Book Award for Best English-Language Mystery for Desert Blood (2005)
- Latino Literary Hall of Fame for Best Historical Fiction for Sor Juana's Second Dream (2000)
- Border-Ford/Pellicer-Frost Award for Poetry (1998)
- Shirley Collier Prize for Literature (UCLA) (1998)
- Premio Aztlán Literary Prize for The Mystery of Survival and Other Stories (1994)
- Massachusetts Artists' Foundation Fellowship Award in Poetry (1989)

== Works ==
- Crimes of the Tongue: Essays and Stories. (Arte Público Press, 2023).
- The Curse of the Gypsy: Ten Stories and a Novella (Arte Público Press, 2018).
- [Un]framing the "Bad Woman": Sor Juana, Malinche, Coyolxauhqui, and Other Rebels with a Cause. Austin, TX: U of Texas Press, 2014.
- Our Lady of Controversy: Alma Lopez's "Irreverent Apparition" (co-edited with Alma Lopez) (University of Texas Press 2011)
- Making a Killing: Femicide, Free Trade, and La Frontera (editor) (University of Texas Press 2010)
- Calligraphy of the Witch (Saint Martin's Press 2007)
- Desert Blood: The Juarez Murders (Arte Publico Press 2005)
- La Llorona on the Longfellow Bridge: Poetry y Otras Movidas (Arte Publico Press 2003)
- Velvet Barrios: Popular Culture and Chicana/o Sexualities (editor) (Palgrave/Macmillan 2003)
- Sor Juana's Second Dream (University of New Mexico Press 1999)
- Chicano Art Inside/Outside the Master's House (University of Texas Press1998)
- The Mystery of Survival and Other Stories (Bilingual Press 1993)
- Beggar on the Córdoba Bridge, full-length collection of poems in the volume Three Times A Woman: Chicana Poetry (Bilingual Press, 1989)
- "Decolonial Feminists Unite! Dorothy Schons and Sor Juana Inés de la Cruz." Portal. Web magazine of Lilas Benson Latin American Studies and Collections. https://sites.utexas.edu/llilas-benson-magazine/2020/10/30/decolonial-feminists-unite-dorothy-schons-and-sor-juana-ines-de-la-cruz/
- "From CARA to CACA: The Multiple Anatomies of Chicano/a Art at the Turn of the New Century" (2019). Chicano and Chicana Art: A Critical Anthology. Eds. Jennifer A. González, C. Ondine Chavoya, Chon Noriega, Terezita Romo. Duke University Press. https://doi.org/10.1215/9781478003403-067
- "The Tattoo," in You Don’t Have a Clue: Latino Young Adult Stories, ed. Sarah Cortez (Houston: Arte Publico Press, 2011)
- “Shortcut to the Moon,” in Hit List: The Best of Latino Mystery, eds. Sarah Cortez and Liz Martínez (Houston: Arte Publico Press, 2009)
- “Lorca’s Widow,” in Zyzzyva: West Coast Writers and Artists (Spring 2005): 145-160.
- “Huitlacoche Crepes,” in U.S. Latino Literature Today, ed. Gabriela Baeza Ventura (New York: Pearson Longman, 2005), 186-188.
- "Rights of Passage: From Cultural Schizophrenia to Border Consciousness in Cheech Marin's Born in East L.A." (2003). In Gaspar de Alba, A. (ed) Velvet Barrios: Popular Culture Studies and Chicana/o Sexualities. New Directions in Latino American Cultures. Palgrave Macmillan, New York. https://doi.org/10.1007/978-1-137-04269-9_12
- “Chamizal” and “Witch Museum,” in This Bridge We Call Home: Radical Visions for Transformation, ed. by Gloria Anzaldúa and Ana Louise Keating (New York: Routledge Press, 2002), 483-485, 517-519.
- “Crooked Foot Speaks,” “The Philosophy of Frijoles,” “After 21 Years, a Postcard from My Father,” “In the Shadow of Greater Things,” “Dust to Dust,” “Gardenias for El Gran Gurú,” “Bamba Basilica,” “El Chamizál,” “The Waters of Grief,” “Sor Juana’s Litany in the Subjunctive,” “Huitlacoche Crepes,” and “Kyrie Eleison for La Llorona,” (in English with Spanish translations) in Entre Líneas, III, ed. Enrique Cortazar (México City: Ediciónes 2000, 1999), 67-101.
- "La Frontera," "Domingo Means Scrubbing," and "Beggar on the Cordoba Bridge. " Floricanto Si!: A Collection of Latina Poetry. Eds. Bryce Milligan, Mary Guerrero Milligan, and Angela De Hoyos. New York: Penguin Books, 1998. 135–138.
- "The Politics of Location of the Tenth Muse of America: An Interview with Sor Juana Ines de la Cruz." In Living Chicana Theory. Ed. Carla Trujillo. Berkeley, California: Third Women Press, 1998. 136–166.
- "After 21 Years, a Postcard?" and "Bamba Basilica." In The Floating Borderlands; Twenty-five Years of U.S. Hispanic Literature. Ed. Lauro Flores. Seattle: University of Washington Press, 1998. 235–237.
- "Born in East L.A. : An Exercise in Cultural Schizophrenia." The Latino/a Condition: A Critical Reader. Eds. Richard Delgado and Jean Stefancic. New York: New York University Press, 1998. 226–230.
- “Descarada/No Shame: An Abridged Politics of Location,” The Wild Good: Lesbian Photographs and Writings on Love, ed. Beatrix Gates (New York: Anchor Books,1996), 217-223.
- "The Alter-Native Grain: Theorizing Chicano/a Popular Culture" in Cultures and Differences: Critical Perspectives on the Bicultural Experience in the United States. Ed. Antonia Darder. Westport, Conn. : Bergin and Garvey, 1995. 103–123.
- "Facing the Mariachis" in Latina Women's Voices from the Borderlands. Ed. Lillian Castillo-Speed. New York: Simon and Schuster, 1995. 37–49.
- "Excerpts from the Sapphic Diary of Sor Juana Inés de la Cruz," in Tasting Life Twice: Lesbian Literary Fiction by New American Writers, ed. Ellen Levy (New York: Avon Books, 1995), 182-190.
- "Malinche's Rights," Currents from the Dancing River: Contemporary Latino Fiction, Nonfiction, and Poetry. Ed. Ray Gonzalez. New York: Harcourt Brace, 1994. 261–267.
- "Malinchista, A Myth Revised," "Literary Wetback," and "Making Tortillas." Infinite Divisions: An Anthology of Chicana Literature. Tey Diana Rebolledo and Eliana S. Rivero. Tucson: University of Arizona Press, 1993.
- "Juana Inés," in Growing Up Chicana/o, ed. Tiffany Lopez (New York: William Morrow & Co., 1993), 69-85
- "The Last Rite," Mirrors Beneath the Earth: Short Fiction by Chicano Writers. Ed. Ray Gonzalez. Willimantic, CT: Curbstone Press; East Haven, CT: Distributed by InBook, 1992. 312–321.
- “Elemental Journey" in After Aztlán: Latino Poets in the Nineties. ed. Ray González (Boston: David Godine Publishers, 1992), 64-74.
- “Literary Wetback,” The Massachusetts Review; XXIX.2, (Fall 1988): 242-246

== Critical studies ==
- Allatson, Paul. Book review of Sor Juana’s Second Dream. In Aztlán: A Journal of Chicano Studies 26.2 (Fall 2001): pp. 231–37.
- Allatson, Paul. “A Shadowy Sequence: Chicana Textual/Sexual Reinventions of Sor Juana.” Chasqui: Revista de Literatura Latinoamericana 33.1 (May 2004): pp. 3–27.
- Chávez-Silverman, Susana. “Alicia Gaspar de Alba.” The Oxford Encyclopedia of Latinos and Latinas in the United States. Eds. Suzanne Oboler and Deena J. González. New York and Oxford: Oxford University Press, 2005. Vol. 2: pp. 185–86.
- Marchino, Lois A. The Oxford Companion to Women's Writing in the United States, edited by Cathy N. Davidson and Linda Wagner-Martin. New York: Oxford University Press, 1995.
- Vivancos Perez, Ricardo F. Los discursos sobre sexualidad en la obra de Alicia Gaspar de Alba. Dissertation: Thesis (M.A.)--Texas A & M University, 2002.
