= Delilah Montoya =

- Born: December 10, 1955 (age 70); Fort Worth, Texas, U.S.
- Other name: Delilah Merriman–Montoya
- Education: University of New Mexico (BA, MA, MFA)
- Occupations: Contemporary visual artist, educator
- Known for: Photography, mixed-media installations
- Style: documentary
- Movement: Chicana art
- Awards: Artadia (2008)
- Website: www.delilahmontoya.com

Delilah Marie Montoya (born December 10, 1955) is an American contemporary visual artist and educator. She is known for her documentary photography, and exploration of Chicana identity. Montoya divides her time between Albuquerque and Houston.

== Life and career ==
Delilah Montoya was born December 10, 1955, in Fort Worth, Texas, and was raised in Omaha, Nebraska, by her Anglo-American father and Latina mother. She earned her BA, MA and MFA degrees from the University of New Mexico.

Her art is noted for its exploration of Chicana identity and for innovative printmaking and photographic processes. She is also noted for her use of mixed-media installations and often incorporates iconic religious symbols in her pieces. Montoya attributes the politicization of her work to the formative influence of her upbringing, within the environment that afforded her exposure to pivotal social movements including the Brown Berets, the Civil Rights Movement, and the plight of Mexican migrant workers.

She has taught at the University of New Mexico, the Institute of American Indian Arts and California State University, before accepting her current position at the University of Houston. She was a 2008 Artadia awardee.

== Art ==
Montoya's work from the 1990s is noted for its exploration of spirituality through the use of Catholic iconography and Mesoamerican folklore images such as the Sacred Heart, Virgin of Guadalupe, La Llorona and Doña Sebastiana. More recent works have explored migration across the US-Mexico border. For example, Montoya’s mixed media installation Sed: The Trail of Thirst (2004-2008) focuses on the absence of people in the desert landscape. The piece depicts the hardships migrants face while illegally crossing the border. The art piece incorporates photographs, videos, digital prints as well as actual objects found left behind along the US-Mexico border. Sed: The Trail of Thirst pays homage to bravery of individuals who have perished while traveling along the border.

Montoya’s well-known installation titled La Guadalupana (1998) incorporates the religious icon the Virgen de Guadalupe. It was originally created to be a part of an exhibition in Musée de Beaux-Arts Denys-Puech in Rodez, France, curated by Francisco Benitez, titled "Ida y Vuelta: Twelve Artists from New Mexico". In the mixed media installation, the centerpiece is a black and white photograph of a shirtless hand-cuffed man named Felix Martínez who has his back towards viewers revealing a vibrant tattoo of the Virgin. The symbolism of the Virgin portrays redemption. The centerpiece is surrounded by colored photographs of other tattoos of the Virgin on different individuals. The piece also incorporates an altar at the base of the centerpiece which includes a blanket, roses, candles and rosaries. Felix Martinez was a veterano who was being held in Albuquerque Detention Center when Montoya took this photo of him. He was detained because of his proximity to a drive-by shooting, and due to complications with the trial, he was later killed in his cell. The art piece critiques prisons and the treatment of Latinos by law enforcement. The depiction of the Virgin in the installation helps viewers infer the nationality of the subject in the centerpiece. Montoya has been criticized for her use of sacred Catholic imagery.

Further, Montoya's series, titled Sacred Heart, explores the intersection between symbolism of the Sacred Heart through Catholicism with the idea of Yolteotl, meaning "heart of God" in Nahuatl. She does so by interpreting what the meaning the Sacred Heat means to members of the Albuquerque, New Mexico in the context of their everyday life. Montoya's photograph series of the Sacred Heart replicates historical casta paintings, which often depicted the social hierarchy between the Spanish, mestizos, indigenous, and African descendants during colonial times. Montoyas' series focuses on the importance of community and family units as she aims at reimagining what the idea of family means. Examples of her Sacred Heart photograph series include Los Jovenes, an image portraying Chicanx youth and their barrio ties, La Genizara, an image portraying a mestiza girl in traditional indigenous clothing with Catholic symbols around here, and La Melinche, a depiction of an indigenous child stripped away from her innocence and Hernán Cortés' bride.

Notable group exhibitions include Chicano Art: Resistance and Affirmation, From the West :Chicano Narrative Photography, Arte Latino: Treasures from the Smithsonian American Art Museum and Common Ground: Discovering Community in 150 Years of Art.

Another notable exhibition and book is, Women Boxers: The New Warriors (2006) which challenges traditional gender roles by depicting female professional boxers. A portrait photograph in Women Boxers titled “Terri ‘Lil Loca’ Lynn Cruz,” depicts Terri Lynn Cruz with her arms crossed revealing her tattoos standing in front of the Sky Ute Casino in Colorado. Cruz is depicted as a female hero in the portrait in defiance against the oppression of women in society. In Women Boxers, Montoya depicts the multifaceted nature of her female subjects.

== Public collections ==
- Smithsonian American Art Museum
- Los Angeles County Museum of Art
- New Mexico Museum of Art
- Mexican Museum (San Francisco)
- The Bronx Museum of the Arts
- Museum of Fine Arts, Houston
