= Celia Herrera Rodriguez =

American educator and artist (born 1952)

- Born: 1952 (age 73–74)
- Education: BA California State University; MFA University of Illinois, Urbana-Champaign; Art and Criticism Art Institute of Chicago
- Known for: Visual arts, ethnic studies

Celia Herrera Rodriguez (born 1952) is an American educator, painter, and performance and installation artist. she has taught programs including Chicano Studies at the University of California, Berkeley for seventeen years. She has also been an adjunct professor in the Diversity Studies program at California College of the Arts of the San Francisco Bay Area. Herrera Rodriguez is also the co-founder and co-director of Las Maestras Center for Xicana[x] Indigenous Thought, Art and Social Practice at UCSB, where she teaches Chicana[x] art history and studio practice in the Department of Chicano and Chicana Studies.

== Education ==
Rodriguez received her B.A. in art and ethnic studies from CSU-Sacramento. She also received her M.F.A. in painting from the University of Illinois, Urbana-Champaign. She went on to study art history, in 1987, theory and criticism at the Art Institute of Chicago.

== Artworks ==
=== Un rezo en cuatro caminos ===
This work was originated presented in III Bienal Internacional de Estandartes Tijuana 2004. Its title means " A Prayer on Four Roads".

=== The Hungry Woman: A Mexican Medea ===
This production was created by Cherrie Moraga in 2005, with Herrera Rodriguez creating the set and costume concepts.

=== A Prayer to the Mother Waters for Peace ===
The multimedia performance was created in 2006 and presented at the Glass Curtain Gallery, in Chicago, Illinois.

== Exhibitions ==
- 2006 Sola, pero bien acompañada: III Bienal Internacional de Estandartes Tijuana 2004
- 2024 Xican-a.o.x. Body, Pérez Art Museum Miami, Florida

Her work is in the collection of the Gorman Museum of Native American Art

== Publications ==
Her series of artworks was published in 2011, in a collection of essays by Cherrie Moraga: “Xicana Codex of Changing Consciousness, Writing 2000- 2010". Alexander, Jacqui. “Pedagogies of Crossing.” Google Books, Duke University Press, 2005

== Bibliography ==
1. Alexander, Jacqui. “Pedagogies of Crossing.” Google Books, Duke University Press, 2005
2. Casiano, Catherine, and Elizabeth C. Ramirez. “La Voz Latina.” Google Books, University of Illinois Press, 2011
3. Moraga, Cherríe, and Celia H. Rodriguez. A Xicana Codex of Changing Consciousness: Writings, 2000-2010. Durham, NC: Duke University Press, 2011.
4. Perez, Laura E. “Chicana Art.” Google Books, Duke University Press, 2007
