= Carla Lucero =

American classical composer

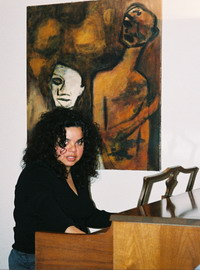
- Born: June 29, 1964 (age 62); Manhattan Beach, California, U.S.
- Occupations: Composer, Librettist

Carla Lucero is an American composer and librettist. A native of Manhattan Beach, California, she now resides in Napa, California. She is of New Mexican and South Asian descent. While at CalArts, she studied with composers Rand Steiger, Leonard Rosenman and Alan Chapman. Her work is concentrated in opera, ballet and chamber music, and her compositional style has been described as complex, and highly melodic, drawing upon the Romantic and Neo-Classical periods, as well as from Flamenco music. She is recognized for incorporating period instruments and indigenous percussion into her orchestration.

== Education ==
She holds a B.F.A. in Music Composition from California Institute of the Arts, 1986.

== Works ==
Los Angeles

- Las Tres Mujeres de Jerusalén (The Three Women of Jerusalem) (Spanish language grand opera) LA Opera (March 2022)
- Reckoning Ramona (multimedia dance-opera) Heidi Duckler Dance (2020)
- Juana (Spanish language chamber opera with co-librettist Alicia Gaspar de Alba) Opera UCLA (2019)
- Out of Circulation, La Brea Woman, Life in the Lap Lane, Most Wanted, Liquid Assets Collage Dance Theater (now Heidi Duckler Dance, dance works premiering 1993-1997)

San Francisco

- REVOLT (chamber ensemble) San Francisco Conservatory of Music’s New Music Ensemble (2021)
- House of Names (ballet) Marika Brussel Dance (2021)
- One O’Clock (scenes from the chamber opera in development, touch) West Edge Opera (2017) (Currently commissioned by Opera Birmingham to premiere in 2024 – with co-librettist Marianna Mott Newirth)
- El Castillo Interior (song cycle) Earplay New Music Ensemble (2016)
- WUORNOS (grand opera) Yerba Buena Center for the Arts (2001)

International Premieres/Performances of New Arrangements

- Mexico, Chile and Spain (selected works 2006 – 2020) La Revuelta (string orchestra), ¡Bronces! ¡Bronces! (choral), Oranges (trio), Ice (trio), Rough Trick (piano solo), The Capture (piano solo), Overture (symphonic), Anticipation (piano solo), Cartas de Amor (piano/vocal)

== Awards ==
- Inaugural Composer (2020) Leni Alexander Festival (Chile)
- Discovery Grant (2019) Opera America
- Horizons Foundation (2007)
- Zellerbach Family Foundation (2000, 2005, 2007)
- San Francisco Arts Commission (2000, 2004, 2006)
- Open Meadows Foundation (2006)
- Advocate Magazine, "Best of Stage" (2001)
- OUT Magazine, “Best in Music” (2001)
- Astraea Foundation (1998, 2000)
- The Creative Work Fund (2000)
- California Arts Council (2000)
- Meet the Composer (1999)
- Lester Horton Award, Outstanding Achievement in Music for Dance (1998)
