= Desert Blood =

2005 novel by Alicia Gaspar de Alba

Desert Blood: The Juárez Murders
- Author: Alicia Gaspar de Alba
- Language: English
- Genre: mystery, thriller
- Publisher: Arte Publico Press
- Publication date: 2005 (first edition)
- Publication place: United States
- Media type: Print
- Pages: 346 p.
- ISBN: 1558854460
- OCLC: 1298730962

Desert Blood: The Juárez Murders is a 2005 mystery thriller by author Alicia Gaspar de Alba based on the violence, kidnapping and femicides that occurred in Ciudad Juárez in 1998.

== Plot ==
Ivon Villa, a lesbian professor living in Los Angeles, returns home to El Paso to adopt a baby girl from Cecilia, a Mexican maquiladora living across the border in Juárez, as well as attend a family reunion. But to her horror, Cecilia turns up dead in the desert, with the baby disemboweled, a victim of the epidemic of homicides of young women from southern Mexico emigrating to the north for better work. Things take a turn for the worse when Ivon's sixteen-year-old sister Irene gets kidnapped while attending a fair in Juárez. The search for her sister leads Ivon to discover a terrifying conspiracy that involves everyone from the Border Patrol to the corrupt judicales in Juárez.

== Characters ==
- Ivon Villa: the protagonist of the story. She is a Hispanic lesbian women studies professor who decides to stay in El Paso after Cecilia's death for research into the horrific deaths for her dissertation. She is hot tempered and stubborn, especially fueled by her mother's attitude towards her.
- Ximena: Ivon's cousin, a social worker living in Juárez, who arranges her to meet up with the maquiladoras for adoption. Accompanies Ivon on her search for Irene.
- Irene Villa: Ivon's sixteen-year-old sister, she is kidnapped while swimming in the Rio Grande. Captain of the swim team and her class's valedictorian, she is ensnared into the decadent world of child pornography.
- Father Francis: a priest of Our Lady of Guadeloupe Church, he is the head of Contra el Silencio a nonprofit organized to speak up against the violence against women, he also leads rasteros walks around Juárez to look for missing bodies.
- Lydia Villa: Ivon and Irene's mother, a deeply religious Catholic women. She resents Ivon for being lesbian, blaming it for her husband's death from alcoholism.
- Raquel: a former lover of Ivon's (and Ximena's current one), she runs an ESL school in Juárez. Accompanies Irene at the fair but then loses her. Afterwards, she helps Ivon with finding Irene, despite the love she still holds for her.
- Rubi Reyna: a TV reporter from Juárez. Hosts a show called ' 'Mujeres Sin Fronteras' ' a news program about the killings in Juárez.
- Pete McCuts: a rookie detective with the El Paso Police Department. He investigates Irene's kidnapping upon request of his father, a powerful judge. He later saves Ivon at the climax of the novel.
- Mireya: a young bar maid in Juárez looking for a better life. Only appears in a POV chapter when she is unwittingly kidnapped by J.W. Her body is later found by Ivon and the others.
- J.W.: a.k.a. Border Patrol Chief Detention Enforcement Officer Jeremy Wilcox, Border Patrol agent whom Ivon initially meets on a flight to El Paso at the beginning of the story, he is actually revealed to be the administrator of an extreme internet pornography site, which specializes in snuff films. He is killed at the end of the novel.

== Themes ==
Several themes in the novel include poverty in Juárez, femicide, and especially the corruption of government institutions on both sides of the border, such as the INS, and the judicales. In her essay "Transfrontera Crimes: Representations of the Juárez Femicides in Recent Fictional and Non-Fictional Accounts," author Marietta Mesmer writes, "Like Rodriguez and Portillo, Gaspar de Alba also indicates that authorities on both sides of the border are actively and directly implicated in those crimes" describing incidents in the book where the police burn victim's clothes, and discussing J.W.'s role in the pornography ring. Both sides benefit from the exploitation of Mexican women due to NAFTA: the US has them working in the factories as maquiladoras, while the Mexican side exploits them for prostitution.

In concurrence with this theme, Alba also touches on the indifference and silence of the media to report on the murders, with the American media failing to point out that victims are also young Mexican-American girls, wanting readers to believe that it is merely a Mexican problem.

Another theme in the novel is the conservative Mexican gender roles that are current throughout the novel, as the Mexican authorities blame the women for being victims, due to wearing makeup and looking promiscuous. Author Irene Mata observes that "Young women who work for the maquiladoras are often represented in the media as loose, immoral mujeres malas (bad women)." In looking at the theoretical construct of femicide, Julia Monárrez Fragoso points out that the social phenomena of crimes against women and girls are “tied into the patriarchal system that predisposes, to a greater or lesser degree, that women be murdered." This idea further extends to American girls as well, with authorities blaming Irene for being kidnapped in the first place. A recurring symbol in the novel is the phrase "So far from the Truth, So close to Jesus", suggesting a Mexico in sync with religion, yet too chaotic to figure out the madness of the murders.

== Reception and awards ==
The novel won the 2005 Lambda Literary Award for "Best Lesbian Mystery" and the 2006 Latino Book Award for Best English Language Mystery.

Numerous reviews were quite positive. In a review for the San Antonio Current, Alejandro Perez wrote that "As Gaspar de Alba shows through her graphic, unsettling descriptions of the perpetrators' words and deeds, the climate that allows this intense verbal and physical violence against women pervades all aspects of society, in Mexico and the U.S. Parts of her novel are shocking and disturbing, but the tale should shock and disturb, like the real-life horror story it is, if only to underscore the conspiracy of silence surrounding the case." Similarly, Darla Baker admired that "While it does not follow the traditional detective genre, with a happy final resolution linking all the facts, Desert Blood unearths several guilty parties and demonstrates the near-impossibility of making any one culprit pay. Thus are power relations understood: those who have power can get away with murder, and the poor have no recourse. But Gaspar de Alba holds; all members of modern society accountable."
