= Laura E. Alvarez =

Latina visual artist

- Born: August 8, 1969; Huntington Beach, California
- Education: BA, University of California Santa Cruz 1992; MFA, San Francisco Art Institute, 1996
- Occupation: Artist
- Organization: Paradiso Arts
- Notable work: Double Agent Sirvienta (D.A.S.)
- Movement: Chicano Art
- Website: www.lauraalvarez.net

Laura E. Alvarez born August 8, 1969, in Huntington Beach, California is a visual artist.

== Background ==
In 1992, Alvarez earned a Bachelor of Arts from University of California, Santa Cruz with an emphasis in printmaking and a Master of Fine Arts with an emphasis in painting from San Francisco Art Institute in 1996.

== Art ==
- Alvarez's Double Agent Sirvienta (D.A.S) series is an on-going project consisting of prints, paintings, music, short films and a rock opera. This series features a spy posing as a domestic worker. This project began in 1995.
- The Double Agent Sirvienta Rock Opera, 1996-1998 is a multimedia film and music project which illustrates the story of a young female soap opera actress relegated to portraying maids who becomes a spy.
- The Double Agent Sirvienta: Blow Up the Hard Drive, Serigraph, 1999 is in the permanent collections of the Los Angeles County Museum of Art and the Smithsonian American Art Museum.

== Selected exhibitions ==
- DAS: Clothes Stories, Pasadena City College, Pasadena, California 2017
- Borderless Dreams, Oceanside Museum of Art, Oceanside, California 2005
- Chicano Art for our Millennium, Mesa Southwest Museum, Tempe, Arizona 2004
- Mixed Feelings, (featuring a commissioned film) USC Fisher Gallery, Los Angeles, California 2002
- Revelatory Landscapes, in collaboration with ADOBE L.A., San Francisco Museum of Modern Art, San Francisco, California 2001
- Revealing and Concealing: Portraits and Identity, Skirball Cultural Center, Los Angeles, California 2000
- Annual Print Exhibition, (Atelier de Mujeres), Self Help Graphics & Art, Los Angeles, California 1999
