= Killer's Paradise =

- Directed by: Giselle Portenier
- Produced by: Karen O'Connor
- Edited by: Cathy Gulkin
- Distributed by: BBC
- Release date: 2007
- Running time: 59 minutes
- Country: Canada
- Language: English

Killer's Paradise is a 2007 documentary exploring the high murder rate of women that has persisted unsolved in Guatemala since the end of the Guatemalan Civil War. The film is a co-production of the National Film Board of Canada and the BBC and was directed by Toronto-based journalist and filmmaker Giselle Portenier. It premiered on 8 March 2007 in Toronto and has been broadcast on multiple channels around the world, including DOC: The Documentary Channel in the United States.

== General description ==
More than 2,200 women were murdered in Guatemala between 2001 and 2008, and countless more raped, tortured, and mutilated. This film displays this epidemic by examining the cases of several murders that occurred during and just prior to filming. In particular, the filmmakers follow the family of Claudina Velásquez, a 19-year-old student who was murdered one night after a party with friends. When the case stalls, Claudina's father, accompanied by a camera crew, makes several appearances at the offices of homicide detectives. Initially, Claudina is dismissed as a prostitute, due to the sandals and navel ring she was found wearing. Claudina's father pressures investigators to actively pursue the case, but is repeatedly told that the case has been passed from one investigator to another.

This case and others in the film, like that of an unidentified woman found naked in a dry riverbed, showcase the pervasiveness of the murder of women in Guatemala, and point to numerous reasons that these murders are almost never solved. Witnesses and the family members of victims interviewed in the film speak on camera reluctantly and only as a last resort, and explain that they fear retaliation from the murderers, who are often young gang members or disaffected soldiers, many jobless following the end of major military conflict in Guatemala. The film also displays the unwillingness of authorities to investigate the murders, owing to corruption and fear of retaliation from perpetrators. A pervasive societal machismo and misogyny are also revealed, as when police deem victims wearing makeup, fingernail polish, or supposedly revealing clothing to be prostitutes and decline to investigate their murders. While the film focuses primarily on young women who are abducted off the streets, it also mentions the large number of women who are beaten or murdered by husbands and boyfriends, cases which are rarely reported or prosecuted. Additionally, a law persists whereby a convicted rapist can be acquitted if his victim agrees to marry him, meaning that many victims of "solved" rape cases are coerced into abusive marriages for fear of their lives.

In spite of the continued increase in the murder rate of women, the film is not entirely without hope. The filmmakers are granted an interview with then President Óscar Berger, who dismisses their criticism as merely "pessimistic," and says he is optimistic that new programs, including a national overhaul of the police force and foreign training for homicide investigators, will improve the situation. Director Portenier's criticism of governmental incompetence is met with frustration and disdain, and Berger leaves the interview abruptly, thanking Portenier and grimacing through his anger. One scene shows a large protest march in the capital, Guatemala City, where citizens cordon off the Ministry of Justice with yellow police tape, declaring it a "crime scene of inaction." Another thread of the film follows the sister of one murder victim as she appeals to the United States Congress, eventually gaining an audience in a committee in order to bring international attention to the plight of women in Guatemala.
