= Yolteotl =

Yolteotl is a Nahua word from Mexico meaning the "heart of God" or someone who contains an almost spiritual creativity ("an enlightened mind"). It is composed of yollotl (heart) and teotl (God, spirit, force, or movement). In Yaqui/Chicana spirituality, which can combine aspects of traditional and Catholic " 'root concepts' (which resonate in all the world's religions)," Yolteotl compares with the Catholic concept of The Sacred Heart (Spanish: El Sagrado Corazon).

Philosophically, Yolteotl is a state of oneness with the universe to be obtained through personal efforts, similar to Nirvana in Buddhism, although Nirvana is an inward form of enlightenment while Yolteotl is an outward form of enlightenment geared towards creation.

== In art and popular culture ==
The term was used in the anime RahXephon to describe a state of being, much like the philosophical definition, in which the Xephon System could be used for its true purpose: the recreation of the world.

The related term "yollotl" (meaning "heart") is used in the MMORPG Wizard101 as the name of a mystical place, pursued throughout the world of Azteca, which based on Mayan and Aztec cultures.
