= Santa Barraza =

American mixed-media artist and painter

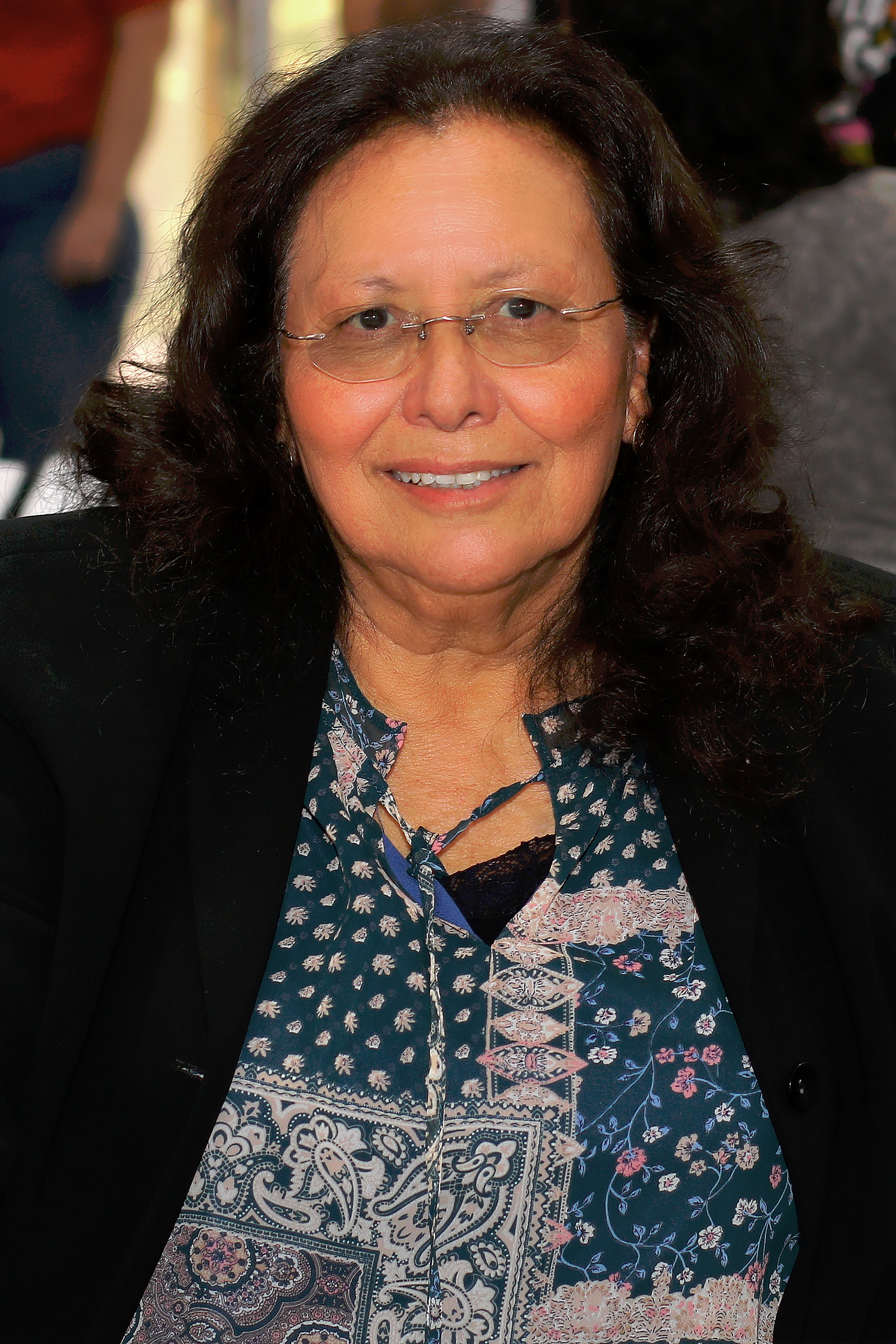
- Barraza at the 2025 Texas Book Festival
- Born: April 7, 1951 (age 75); Kingsville, Texas
- Education: University of Texas at Austin (BFA, MFA)
- Style: Chicana/o Art

Santa Barraza (born April 7, 1951) is an American mixed-media artist and painter who is well known for her colorful, retablo style painting. A Chicana, Barraza pulls inspiration from her own mestiza ancestry and from pre-Columbian art. Barraza is considered to be an important artist in the Chicano art movement. The first scholarly treatment of a Chicana artist is about her and is called Santa Barraza, Artist of the Borderlands, which describes her life and body of work. Barraza's work is collected by the Mexic-Arte Museum, and other museums around the United States and internationally. She currently lives in Kingsville, Texas.

== Biography ==
Barraza was born in the Kingsville, Texas, home of her grandmother, Victoria Meza Barraza. She was the second of six children. Barraza's father, Joaquin Barraza, worked hard to provide opportunities for his children and her mother, Frances Contreras, was a feminist. Both of her parents jointly owned a small car repair shop. Growing up, Barraza was exposed to many indigenous, South Texan, Chicano cultural traditions. Her aunt on her father's side was a curandera, and Barraza would accompany her when she trained in Mexico. These visits to Mexico, watching the rituals her aunt performed, became part of her later work. Her parents were Catholic and the imagery of the religion also influenced much of the iconography of her later work. Ironically, her given name, Santa, proved problematic when she was to be baptized because the priest felt the name was sacrilegious since "Santa" means "saint" in Spanish.

Barraza recalls that there was a great deal of stigmatization against the Mexican-American students as far back as elementary school. Kingsville itself had a history of oppression towards Mexicans and Chicanos living in the area.

Barraza met and became friends with Chicana artist Carmen Lomas Garza when they were both at H. M. King High school together. Barraza's first art classes were taken at the high school. She was also the art editor for the high school's literary magazine.

Barraza briefly attended Texas Arts and Industry University, (now Texas A&M University, Kingsville), enrolling in 1969. It was during this time that she learned about Mexican and pre-Columbian art and was exposed to the growing Chicano Movement. In 1969, Barraza became involved with the activist group, Mexican American Youth Organization (MAYO).

In 1971, Barraza transferred to the University of Texas at Austin (UT) in order to pursue studio arts and because it was important to her to receive a BFA rather than a BA.

Barraza faced a sense of displacement when she was at UT. She recalls that she would walk around campus for "months and never see another brown face." At UT, Barraza studied with Jacinto Quirarte, who was the only Latino or Chicano faculty member at the time. Quirarte was considered an important historiographer of Chicano art and her association with him was a big influence on her later work. In his class, Barraza was introduced to his important work in Chicano art history, Mexican-American Art, which they had to use in manuscript form. Being a part of his class also helped introduce her to many of her friends who became activists. Barraza recalls that while she was at UT, she knew she wanted to be an artist and make a difference and she chose to do this by painting the images she felt were missing from the textbooks: Chicana imagery.

Barraza met her husband at UT where the two of them had several classes together.

When Barraza graduated with her BFA from UT and after the birth of her daughter, Andrea, she affiliated with Chicano artists in San Antonio and Austin called Los Quemados. According to organizer César Martínez, Los Quemados, which was intended to be a structureless group, "never really jelled," and the artists "drifted apart" after their inaugural exhibition at the Mexican Cultural Institute in San Antonio on June 20, 1975. The only other Quemados exhibition took place at St. Philip's College on September 16, 1975, in San Antonio.

Differences of opinion caused Barraza to form her own group in 1977, called Mujeres Artistas de Suroeste (MAS). Barraza and the others who left Los Quemados didn't feel like Quemados was political enough. Barraza and others in MAS opened their own studio space. MAS organized a key feminist conference, Plástica Chicana Conferencia, in 1979 which was funded in part by the National Endowment for the Arts. The conference had many well-known scholars, critics and artists, including Garza, and included workshops created by the Mexican fine arts community on a variety of topics on the arts. MAS curated and promoted art exhibits throughout Texas and in Arizona. MAS was active until the mid 1980s. Around this time, several members of MAS left Texas for better careers and the corporate status of MAS was allowed to lapse. Due to confusion between the San Antonio-based Con Safo art group and the Quemados (which stems from an essay by Quirarte), Barraza has several times been listed as a member of Con Safo, though she never joined the group.

Barraza's first job in the arts was as a graphic designer at Steck-Vaughan, which she took right out of college to help support her husband and new baby. During this time, she pursued her Masters, receiving her graduate degree in 1982. When Barraza was working on her masters, at first she wanted to study Chicano art history, however, the faculty insisted that Chicano art history didn't exist. Around this time, she began to study her own family history. Studying her family history also helped her become more aware of various social inequities and injustices that had been done to Mexicans in Texas over time. She found that she was a descendant of shaman Don Pedro Jaramillo, and of the Carancahuas.

In 1985, Barraza accepted a teaching position at La Roche College. Applying for the job and the decision to leave for Pittsburgh caused a great deal of anxiety for her, both in terms of starting something new, and also from the perspective that she lacked support from her husband. Barraza took her daughter with her to Pittsburgh and taught graphic design at La Roche College. She felt that La Roche was very supportive of her work. Later, she accepted a position at Penn State in 1988. At Penn State, she began a study-abroad program to Puebla in Mexico that was very popular among the students. Barraza was an associate professor at the Art Institute of Chicago from 1993 to 1996. Her impetus for leaving Chicago came about after she was denied tenure, and one of the reasons given for the denial was that her art was "just" folk art. Later, she was offered a position at the University of Texas at San Antonio, which she turned down in favor of working at Texas A&M University, Kingsville. She currently teaches art at Texas A&M University, Kingsville. She has been the chair of the art department there since 1998.

== Art ==
Shifra Goldman identifies "three phases" of Barraza's art: historical, personal and symbolic.

Barraza's early work, when she was working as a graphic designer and raising her daughter was marked by a "powerful use" of black and white tonality. During this time period, she was also exploring different types of subject matter. Her early work, was large-scale and extremely detailed, using photographic references. Barraza's work after the 1990s show a renewed interest in religious iconography, Mexican history and use of Aztec and Mayan motifs. Barraza also started working more with oil painting, enamels and acrylics. She is also considered to be a master printmaker.

Barraza feels that her creativity comes from emotion and in turn, that this emotion comes from her family and physical ties to Texas. She has traced her personal heritage back to the 1700s and discovered that she has Native American (Karankawan) roots. Barraza feels that her ancestors had a sense of determination that were passed down to her.

Barraza's art often uses motifs from folk art to express a sense of spirituality in her work. She has been influenced by Mexican-American experiences and Mayan and Aztec artistic themes, such as codices. Barraza taps into the concept of nepantla, or the mythic borderland of Hispanic culture for much of her artwork. Blending Christian and pre-Columbian symbolism is part of the way that Barraza reshapes the traditional narrative of history. Barraza's trips to Mexico during the 1990s helped solidify her love for the iconography and history of Mexico. Barraza often uses the image of the Virgen de Guadalupe as an "empowerment symbol" for women. Barraza has also used traditional media, such as sand paintings, to connect with her cultural past. She describes the process of reusing traditional imagery as a way to appropriate the ancient past and then to update it in a contemporary art expression. Reusing the imagery of the past allows Barraza to "reimagine" the future of her own desires, her own making. In many of the futures that Barraza imagines, she is focusing on the "future of womanhood." She has also been influenced by the painter Frida Kahlo and the photographer Lorna Simpson.

Barraza uses a variety of media, materials and techniques to create her work. She has been commissioned to do large scale murals, such as the mural done for the Biosciences rotunda at the University of Texas at San Antonio (1996). Barraza also enjoys creating small-scale work on paper. Often her work is vividly colorful. Barraza's work as an artist has been successful because she has allowed it to evolve over time, yet still staying true to her vision of equality and freedom for all people. Barraza's work forces viewers to ask questions about her art and therefore, to question art and its relationship to the world at large.

== Awards ==
- Recognition Award for Contribution in the Arts from National Chicanos in Higher Education
- Reader’s Digest-Lila Wallace Grant
- Professional Achievement Award from the Women of Color Association
- Women’s Caucus for Art Mid Career Achievement (2008)
- Heroes for Children Award by the State of Texas Board of Education (2008)
- Suenos Cultura y Vida Recipient by LULAC Corpus Christi (2012)
- Lifetime Achievement Award in the Visual Arts, Mexic-Arte Museum (2014)
