= Yreina Cervantez =

American artist and Chicana activist (born 1952)

- Born: 1952 (age 73–74); Garden City, Kansas
- Education: University of California, Santa Cruz, University of California, Los Angeles
- Notable work: La Ofrenda

Yreina Cervantez (born 1952) is an American artist and Chicana activist who is known for her multimedia painting, murals, and printmaking. She has exhibited nationally and internationally, and her work is in the permanent collections of the Smithsonian American Art Museum, The Mexican Museum, the Los Angeles County Museum, and the Los Angeles Museum of Contemporary Art.

== Biography ==
Cervantez was born in Garden City, Kansas and raised in Mount Palomar, California. Cervantez's mother was creative and served as an artistic inspiration to her daughter. Her childhood was spent in culturally segregated, rural areas and exposure to the conservative attitude of these neighborhoods inspired Cervantez to later join the Chicana/o movement. Later her family moved to Orange County. During high school, she focused on her watercolor skills. Cervantez’s art incorporates many political messages and topics. Cervantez became politicized during her Junior year of high school upon her transferring to Westminster high school in Orange County, California. She and many other Chicano & Chicana students created United Mexican American Students (UMAS), the first in her school. Cervantez then received a BA from the University of California, Santa Cruz and in 1989 graduated from the University of California, Los Angeles with an MFA. A founding member of the Los Angeles art collective Self Help Graphics, Cervantez spent six years working for this non-profit dedicated to supporting community artwork. In 1987, Cervantez's work was shown in Chicago at the Mexican Fine Arts Center Museum. Her work was also part of the CARA project and traveling exhibition which opened in 1983 and had its final venue in 1994. Cervantez was a cast member of the feminist film, Define (1988), by O.Funmilayo Makarah. Between 1990 and 1993, she worked as a coordinator at the Los Angeles Municipal Art Gallery. Cervantez is currently a professor emerita of Chicano Studies at California State University, Northridge.

== Art ==
Cervantez's work often includes a rich visual vocabulary that draws inspiration from pre-Columbian history, Central American politics, the urban landscape of Los Angeles and sometimes herself, as a viewer of what she is painting. She overlaps two different "worlds," one of the present and another of the past, creating a visual space where ideologies are explored and examined. She uses the visual language of Aztlan to create a new artistic vocabulary.

Growing up, Cervantez did not see many Latina images in popular culture and because of this, her portraits of Latina women and her self-portraits became an important part of her work. Cervantez's self-portraits show an artist that is at once whole and fragmented, experiencing nepantla. Cervantes often uses the self-portrait technique in order to explore cultural identity. In many of her self-portraits, she continues to blend contemporary culture with Aztec and mesoamerican imagery. Cervantez uses much of this type of iconography of the past in order to update the symbols and create a modern feminist perspective. Her female figures are often described as "inspiring representations of female agency." Cervantez's art is also concerned with helping the viewer recognize that Chicanos are already in their own "ancestral homelands" and are actually not "immigrants" to the United States. On the topic of agency Cervantez said this in an interview with CSUN Daily Sundial, “Women have not been very visible in today’s art…”. “And if they have, they are portrayed very stereotypically. These pieces talk about the dignities of women and their strengths while reclaiming a sense of empowerment and agency.”

Cervantez has also created many large-scale murals in Los Angeles and is considered a pioneer of the Chicana mural movement. Alongside artist Judy Baca, she was involved with designing and painting part of The Great Wall of Los Angeles, which is thought to be the longest mural in the world. Cervantez has been a major influence on artist Favianna Rodriguez, who was so impressed with a printmaking class she took with Cervantez that she quit school to become a full-time artist.

In 2024, her work was included in the Xican-a.o.x. Body group exhibition at the Pérez Art Museum Miami, Florida, which traveled from the Cheech Marin Center for Chicano Art & Culture of the Riverside Art Museum, California.

=== La Ofrenda (1989) ===
La Ofrenda (1989) is Cervantes’s most notable work and is often pointed to as an example of intersectionality in art. On the left side of the mural Cervantez paints an indigenous woman surrounded by iconography and examples of indigenous spirituality and religious practice. In the middle Dolores Huerta is centered as a well known Chicana woman accompanied again by iconography such as the United Farm Workers (UFW) insignia.Thus the mural portrays the dichotomy between indigeneity and femininity and what the two mean specifically through the lens of a Chicana woman. Since its creation it has been restored in 2012 by the Los Angeles based Social and Public Art Resource Center (SPARC).

Cervantez’s La Ofrenda tackles particular exclusionary praxis in activist movements in a myriad of ways. Most notably, in the mural Cervantez places the contemporaneous iconography of activism in juxtaposition with Latina, Chicana, and Indigenous women who are often excluded from the discourse of a social justice movement.
