= Sandra de la Loza =

American artist (born 1968)

- Born: 1968 (age 57–58)
- Known for: Public art, video art, documentation

Sandra de la Loza (born 1968) is an American artist living and working in Los Angeles. She is the founder and only official member of the Pocho Research Society of Erased and Invisible History (2001), a collaborative project working with artists, activist, and historians to investigate place and memory through public interventions.

== Education ==
Sandra studied Latin American history and culture at the Universidad Nacional Autónoma de Mexico (UNAM), and earned a B.A. in Chicano Studies from the University of California, Berkeley. She completed her M.F.A. at California State University, Long Beach in 2004.

== Selected works ==
As part of Pacific Standard Time: Art in Los Angeles 1945-1980 the Los Angeles County Museum of Art presented Mural Remix: Sandra de la Loza, a project examining forgotten Chicano murals produced during the 1970s through experimental video documentation.

In 2024, the Pérez Art Museum Miami showcased her work as part of Xican-a.o.x. Body, a group show expanding on the art narratives by Chicano artists from 1960s to the present.

== Awards ==
In 2013, Sandra was awarded the California Community Foundation, Mid-Career Artist Grant, Artist in Residence Grant, Department of Cultural Affairs and in 2012 she was awarded the Art Matters Grant. Sandra was the Project Research Fellow (2009–2011) Chicano Studies Research Center, University of California, Los Angeles as part of Pacific Standard Time: Art in L.A. 1945–1980, The Getty Foundation.
