= Tey Diana Rebolledo =

Editor and literary critic (b. 1937)

Tey Diana Rebolledo is an editor and literary critic. Rebolledo specializes in Spanish and Chicana literature.

== Personal life ==
Rebolledo is a native of Las Vegas, New Mexico, born April 29, 1937. Her parents were Washington Antonio and Esther Vernon Galindo Rebolledo. Both of her parents were immigrants, her father from Peru and her mother from Mexico. Her father was a Spanish professor at what was then called the Las Vegas Normal School (present day New Mexico Highlands University) and later Connecticut College for Women. She describes the Las Vegas of her youth as small, rural, and racially segregated between Anglos and Hispanics. When she was ten, her family moved to Connecticut because of her father's job. When she was fourteen, Rebolledo's father died of a brain tumor and her family moved yet again, this time to Chula Vista, California where one of her uncle's lived. Her mother returned to Mexico during Rebolledo's senior year of high school, but Rebolledo stayed in the United States to finish her studies. She was then awarded a scholarship to attend Connecticut College. Rebolledo was greatly influenced by her parents' examples. Her father hosted a Spanish-language radio talk show that focused on Latino culture.

== Education ==
- BA, Spanish, Connecticut College, 1959
- MA, Latin American Studies, University of New Mexico, 1962
- PhD, Spanish, University of Arizona, 1979

== Professional contribution ==
Rebolledo taught at The University of North Carolina at Chapel Hill, The University of Nevada, Reno, and the University of New Mexico. At the University of New Mexico, she is Professor Emerita in the Department of Spanish and Portuguese and also Distinguished Regents' Professor of Spanish.

Rebolledo is one of the foundational voices in Chicano/a/x literary criticism. Her groundbreaking anthology, Infinite Divisions: An Anthology of Chicana Literature (1993), edited with Eliana Rivero, was "the first major anthology" of Chicana writings. The text brought together different genres with relevant historical documents and included writings by Gloria E. Anzaldúa, Ana Castillo, Lorna Dee Cervantes, Denise Chávez, Sandra Cisneros, Pat Mora, Cherríe Moraga, and María Helena Viramontes.

== Books ==
Single-Authored

- Women Singing in the Snow: An Analysis of Chicana Literature (University of Arizona Press, 1995)
- The Chronicles of Panchita Villa and Other Guerrilleras: Essays on Chicana/Latina Literature and Criticism (University of Texas Press, 2005)

Edited

- Las Mujeres Hablan: An Anthology of Nuevo Mexicana Writers. With Erlinda Gonzales-Berry and Teresa Márquez. (University of New Mexico, 1988)
- Nuestras Mujeres: Hispanas of New Mexico, Their Images and Their Lives, 1582-1992 (El Norte Publications, 1992)
- Infinite Divisions: An Anthology of Chicana Literature. With Eliana Rivero. (University of Arizona Press, 1993)
- Women's Tales from the New Mexico WPA: La Diabla a Pie. With Teresa M. Márquez. (Arte Público Press, 2000)
