= Diana Yesenia Alvarado =

Chicana artist

Diana Yesenia Alvarado (born 1992) is a Chicana artist. Alvarado utilizes the medium of ceramics to express her Mexican heritage and recall her childhood in Los Angeles.

== Biography ==
Alvarado was born in 1992 and raised in Los Angeles, California. Her parents at a young age would separate, mainly living with her mother in Southeast LA and visiting her father between East and South LA. Alvarado grew a passion for film and photography in high school, later attending community college to take art class and eventually would transfer to California State University, Long Beach.

== Art ==
Alvarado’s ceramic creations draws heavily from Mexican culture, as Yves B. Golden notes the similarities between her pieces and traditional recuerdos. Additionally, the cartoonish figures with bright, colorful appearances that Alvarado creates are often likened to the visual elements of Los Angeles, such as “hand-painted characters on the side of liquor and grocery stores, [and] the multi-colored lettering on the window of the party supply store.” Alvarado and others come from a wave of emerging artists in ceramics from LA, similar to a previous wave of the 1950s that changed how ceramics were viewed. Alvarado is committed to allowing open interpretation of her art pieces and discusses how her surroundings influence the meaning of her work. In an interview with Carhartt Work In Progress, Alvarado describes her working environment, her studio located in her grandmother's garage. In this same interview, Alvarado talks about the process of working with clay, revealing the depth and significance of her practice. In another interview with Amadeus Mag, Alvarado emphasizes how working with ceramics and creating 3-Dimensional art pieces has been both challenging and fulfilling for her expression. Additionally, Alvarado opens up about her thought process behind selecting colors for her art work and insights on her approach towards the application of glaze.

== Exhibitions ==
Alvarado was featured in her first show in early 2018 in Los Angeles; in the years since most of her shows have centered around LA, yet she has also been featured in exhibitions in New York, Madrid, and Stockholm. Alvarado has had 18 exhibitions in the past five years and has collaborated with artists like Alfonso Gonzalez Jr. and Jaime Muñoz.
