= Cascarón =

Hollowed-out egg filled with confetti or toys

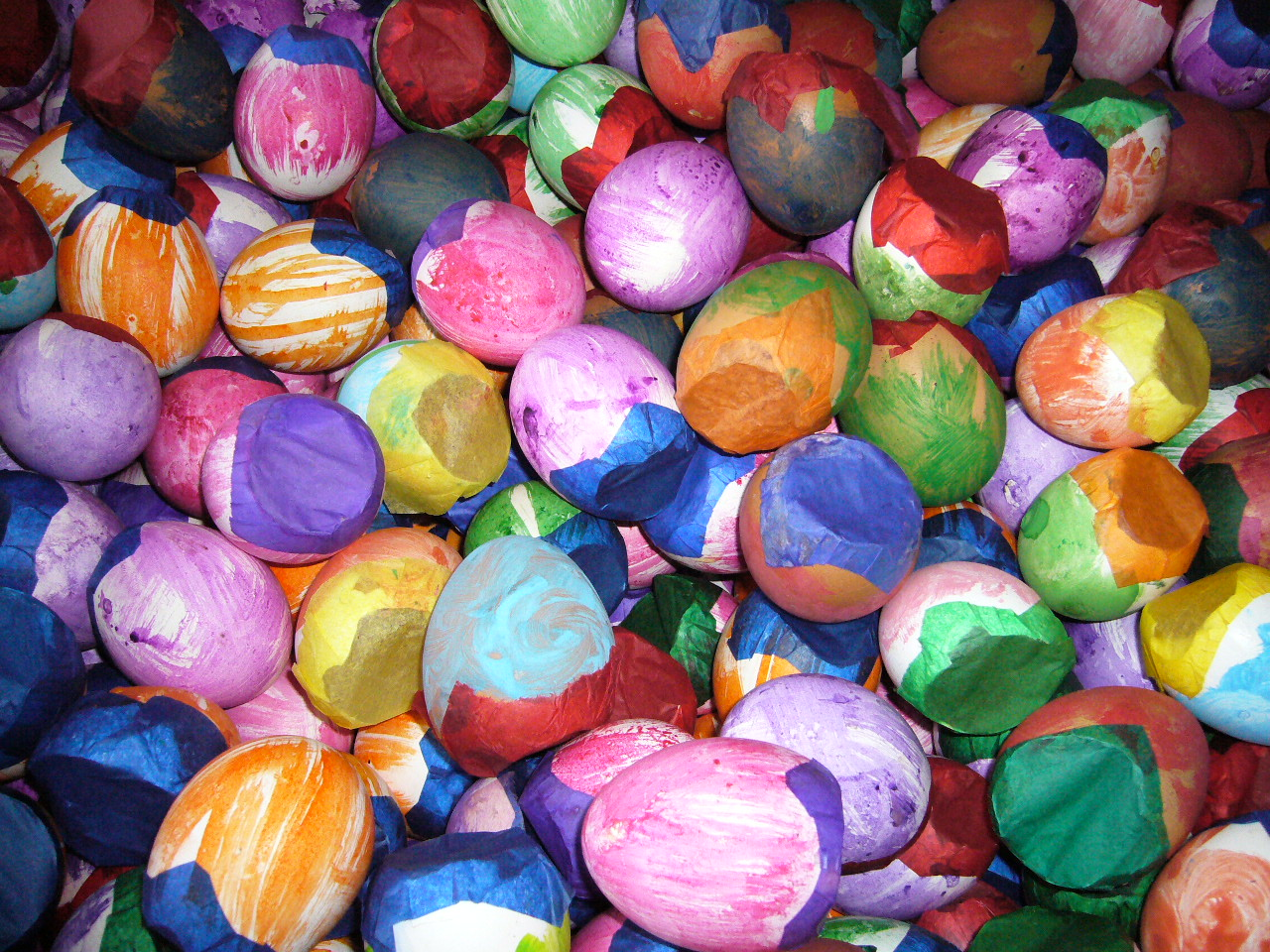
Cascarones

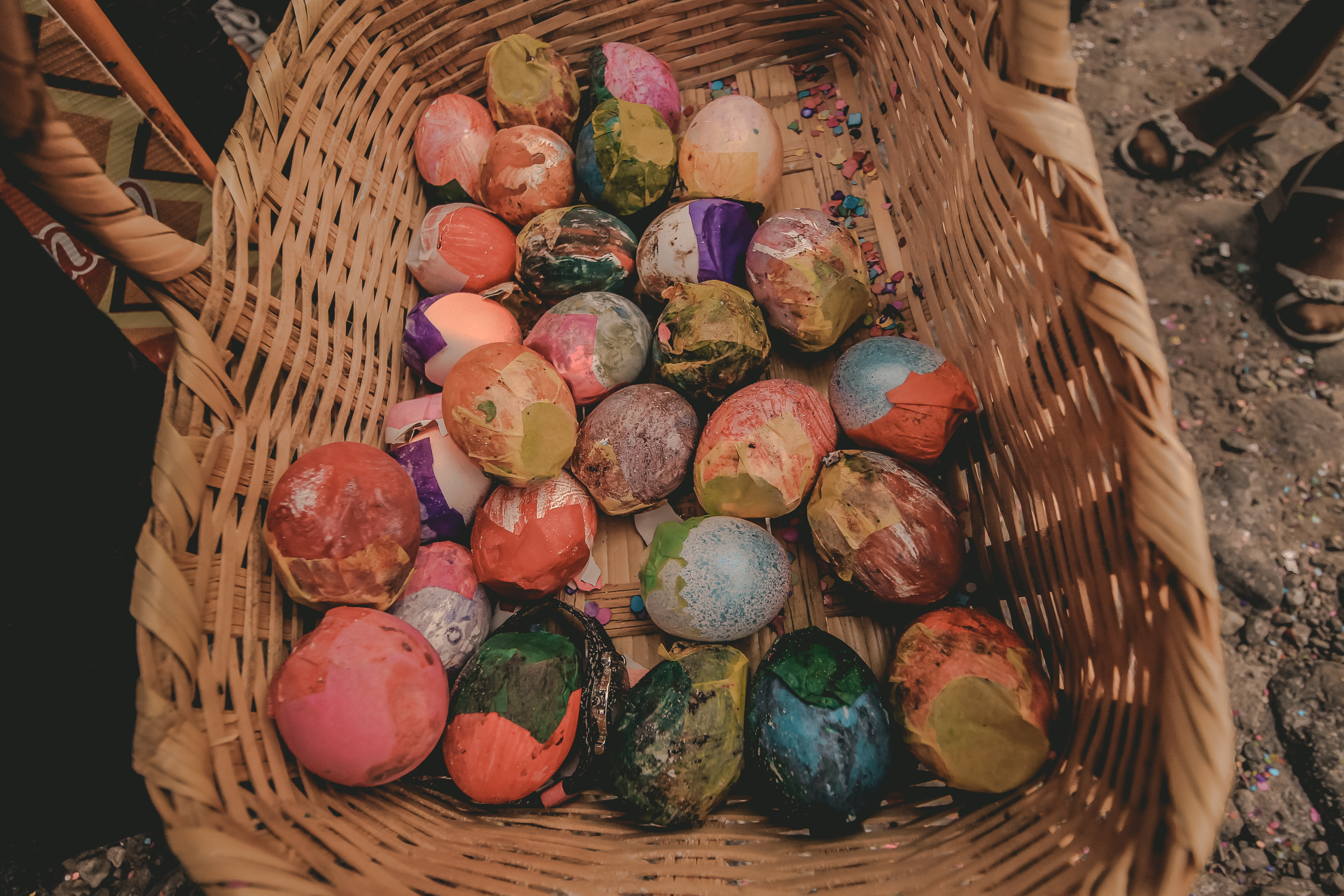
Cascarones, Ajijic

A cascarón (pl. cascarones, meaning 'eggshell', the augmentative form of cáscara, 'shell'), known as huevo chimbo in Central America, is a hollowed-out chicken egg filled with confetti or small toys. Cascarones are common throughout Mexico and are similar to the Easter eggs popular in many other countries. They are mostly used in Mexico during Carnival, but in American and Mexican border towns, the cultures combined to make them a popular Easter tradition.

Decorated, confetti-filled cascarones may be thrown or crushed over the recipient's head to shower them with confetti. This originated in Spain. When a child would act up, their father would crack an egg over their head as a consequence, and a way of showing his disappointment in them. In addition to Easter, cascarones have become popular for occasions including birthdays, New Year's, Halloween, Cinco de Mayo, Dieciséis, Day of the Dead, and weddings. Wedding cascarones can be filled with rice. Like many popular traditions in Mexico, cascarones are increasingly popular in the southwestern United States. For example, they are especially prominent during the two-week, citywide festival of Fiesta in San Antonio, Texas. Cascarones are usually made during Easter time.

In order to make cascarones, one can use a pin or knife to break a hole in the end of the eggshell and pour the contents out. The shell is then cleaned out, decorated as desired, and allowed to dry, before it is filled with confetti or a small toy. Usually, glue is applied around the outside of the hole and covered with tissue paper.

== History ==
Cascarones are said to have been first brought to Europe by Marco Polo from China, where perfume-filled eggs were given as gifts. A popular myth credits Empress Carlota and Emperor Maximilian with bringing cascarones to Mexico in the mid-1800s, but they cannot have been the first. Accounts of weddings and celebrations in California as early as 1826 include accounts of cascarones, often as means for mischievous girls to attract the attention of eligible bachelors. The Los Angeles Star mentioned the eggs in an article about Christmas celebrations on January 4, 1855, saying: "In the city, cascarones commanded a premium, and many were complemented with them as a finishing touch to their headdress."
