= Pamela J. Peters =

Navajo multimedia documentarian

Pamela Peters
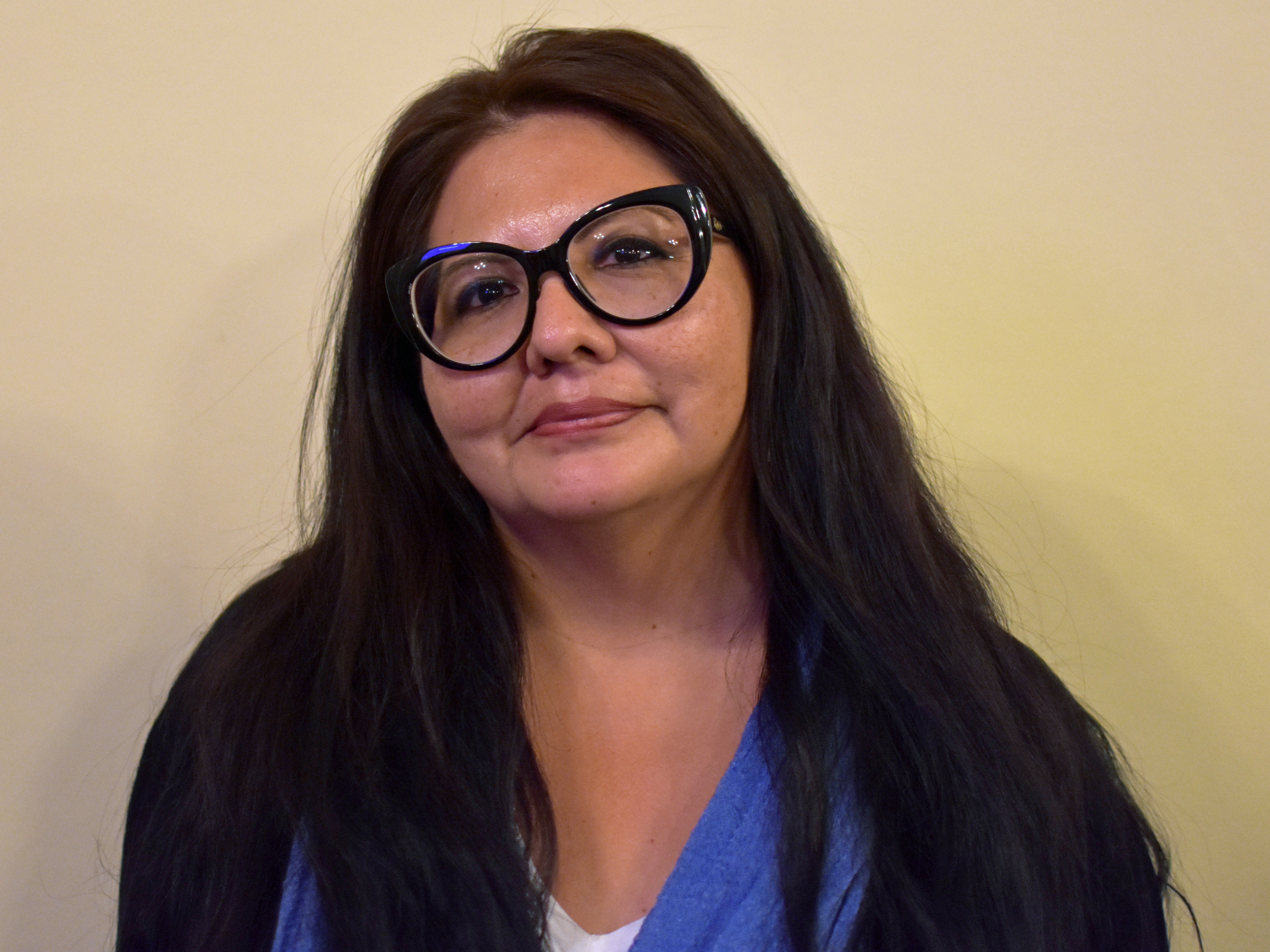
- Born: Shiprock, New Mexico
- Citizenship: Navajo Nation
- Occupations: Filmmaker, Photographer
- Notable work: My Once Life

Pamela J. Peters (born 1970 – Shiprock, New Mexico) is an Indigenous multimedia documentarian from the Navajo Nation. She produces films and photography exhibitions with the intent to deconstruct stereotypes of Native Americans in the mainstream media. Recent projects include “Legacy of Exiled NDNZ,” inspired by the 1961 Kent Mackenzie film The Exiles, which examines the inter-generational impact of the Indian Relocation Act of 1956 in historical and contemporary Los Angeles, and “Real NDNZ Re-Take Hollywood,” which recreates iconic movie star portraits from the days of classical Hollywood cinema featuring contemporary Native American actors.

Peters was born to the Tachiiʼnii clan (Red Running into the Water, her mother's clan), and born for the Tiʼaashcíʼí clan (Red Bottom People, her father's clan). She moved to Los Angeles from the reservation when she was 17. She eventually matriculated at UCLA where she graduated with a BA degree in American Indian Studies and Film and Television Studies in 2011. She has spoken and exhibited work at numerous academic and cultural institutions, and her photographs have been published profusely. Her poem, "My Once Life," won the 2016 Button Poetry Video Contest. Some of Peters's work was featured in the February/March issue of "Cowboys and Indians" along with an interview of Tommy Orange.
