= Ralph Cuarón =

American communist

Ralph Cuarón (1923-2002) was a Chicano communist organizer and leader of many local community associations and workers unions throughout his life. He was an advocate for Black-Brown unity and was heavily criticized for his activism by anti-communist politician Jack Tenney, being described as a "monster" for his idea of a Mexican-American ethnic class consciousness.

Cuarón became the first national youth director of Asociación Nacional México-Americana (ANMA) in the 1950s, after being introduced to leftist organizers in Los Angeles by Francisca Flores.

In the 1970s, Cuarón moved from East Los Angeles to the mountains of the San Jacinto in Riverside County, where he became active in community organizing and meeting with labor leaders like Lou Diskin and community activists from the Young Workers Liberation League. The FBI closely monitored Cuarón and his relationship with the local San Bernardino-Riverside County Communist Party, referring to his work as resulting "in the indoctrination of Chicanos." In 1974, he was hired as a custodian at the University of California, Riverside and engaged in union and campus community organizing on issues of labor rights, political activism, and education reform.
