= Felicia "Fe" Montes =

American artist (born 1975)

Felicia "Fe" Montes (born November 29, 1975) is a Chicana Indigenous artist, activist, and educator based in Los Angeles. She is a multimedia artist, poet, performer, and professor whose work focuses on cultural activism, feminism, and community empowerment. Montes co-founded Mujeres de Maiz, Botanica del Barrio, In Lak Ech, and El Mercado y Mas, organizations aimed at fostering Chicana and indigenous artistic expression and activism. She has contributed to transnational art exhibitions such as Zapatistas, Peace Dignity Journeys, and La Red Xicana Indigena.

== Education ==
Montes holds a Bachelor of Arts from the University of California, Los Angeles in World Arts and Cultures with a minor in Chicanx studies from the Cesar E. Chavez Department of Chicana/o Studies. She earned a Master of Arts in Chicanx Studies from California State University, Northridge and a Master of Fine Arts in Public Practice Art from Otis College of Art and Design.

== Public art practice ==
=== Botanica Del Barrio Rolling Remedios Cart ===
In her project entitled Botanica Del Barrio, Montes aims to educate and facilitate a dialogue about Mexican traditional medicine. The project is both a workshop and visual installation; Montes is the teacher educating the viewer on the art, and the plants are arranged intentionally on a cart that is painted with "Botanica del Barrio" in large letters. The rolling nature of the cart bridges the gap between the artist and the audience by creating a space for education outside the home or expensive wellness clinic.

=== Politricked Public Art Cart ===
The Politricked Public Art Cart was created by Montes and Joel "rage.one" Garcia and it aims to disperse "know your rights information" through "posters, projections, performance, poetry, and politics". The Politricked Public Art Cart looks like a corn or elote vendor cart to allow for mobility and travel to various communities. The Politricked Public Art Cart uses a TV monitor and P.A. system to disperse political information through images, performances, and video. Montes hopes that this format of arts activism can be used as a template by other artists to educate.

=== The Bumpin' Bici ===
The Bumpin' Bici is a public performance piece meant to raise the consciousness of audiences through performative protest in the streets. The Bumpin' Bici consists of a sound system connected to a bike basket. Montes takes on the character "Raramujer" who is an "urban indigenous wom[a]n who shares oral history and urban indigenous worldviews across Los Angeles". Montes rides the bike through the streets reciting "floetry" and playing indigenous songs.

=== LACMA Olmec Exhibit Indigenous Peoples Day Intervention ===
On October 12, 2010, a ceremony to honor ancestors and spirits was organized by Montes, to commemorate Indigenous People's Day. The main purpose of the ceremony was to put a blessing on the Olmec stones and statues that were in the exhibition at the Los Angeles County Museum of Art. The ceremony took place unannounced and in places throughout the LACMA that were unauthorized for public use. The ceremony consisted of Native prayer drumming, Aztec dance, and huge projections of Indigenous history, resistance, and music.

== Collections ==
Montes' work is in the permanent collection of the Los Angeles County Museum of Art. Documentation of her performance work is held in the archive of the Woman's Building, Los Angeles.

== Publications ==
=== "In Memoriam: Jenni Rivera: La Chicana De La Banda" ===
In the article entitled "In Memoriam: Jenni Riveria: La Chicana De La Banda," Montes discusses Jenni Rivera's singing career and life as an activist. Throughout this article, Montes reveals how Rivera's emphasis on common themes such as love, sadness, and freedom to live made Montes feel less pain. This article emphasizes Rivera's background and influence on Chicano culture: "Jenni Rivera was truly a Chicana Mexican regional music star, representing LBC (Long Beach City), homies, single moms, and homegirls from across Cali, the southwest, and the Americas".

=== Lotería Xicana ===
In this article published in Aztlán: A Journal of Chicano Studies, Montes discusses her spoken word piece entitled "Lotería Xicana". This piece focuses on Montes' multiple identities coming together to create her. "Lotería Xicana" is an art piece that combines poetry, props, images, and music. Montes' "hope is that women of color can connect and relate to these pieces and realize that each of us has our own role and way". This project demonstrates the personal element in Montes art, and her goals to unite, and build a community.

=== Full Moon Coyolxauhqui Circle ===
In Voice from Ancestors: Xicanx and Latinx Spiritual Expressions and Healing Practices, Montes and Martha R. Gonzales write a chapter entitled "Full Moon Coyolxauhqui Circle" to describe one of Montes' community building projects centered around female empowerment. Montes created a community of women that come together to sing, celebrate the stars, listen to one another, and let go of worries. In her chapter, Montes emphasizes the need for women to have a community to process emotions with.

== Ten Fe ==
In 2011, she published several performance pieces under the title Ten Fe.

== Mujeres de Maiz en Movimiento: Spiritual Artivism, Healing Justice, and Feminist Praxis ==
She co-edited the book Mujeres de Maiz en Movimiento: Spiritual Artivism, Healing Justice, and Feminist Praxis published in 2024 by the University of Arizona Press.

== Publications ==
- Ten Fe
- "Sacrificios," published in Fleshing the Spirit: Spirituality and Activism in Chicana, Latina and Indigenous Women's Lives
- "Movement and Spirit: The Artivism of Felicia Montes"
