= Irene Pérez =

Chicana muralist

- Known for: Co-founder of Las Mujeres Muralistas
- Notable work: "500 Años de Resistencia", "Latinoamerica", "Para El Mercado", "Maestrapeace"

Irene Peréz is a muralist known for her membership in the Latina muralist group, Las Mujeres Muralistas and her contributions to the group mural Maestrapeace, at the Woman's Building in San Francisco, California.

== Biography ==
Perez was born and currently lives in Oakland, California. Her mother, Maria del Refugio Perez, is from Zacatecas, Mexico, and her father, Estanislao Alanis Perez is from Sierra Blanca, Texas. Perez attended school in the Bay Area; she attended the Academy of Art University in San Francisco with a focus on illustration and attended the San Francisco Art Institute for printmaking before co-founding Las Mujeres Muralistas. Las Mujeres Muralistas is an all-female Latina muralist group based out of the Bay Area responsible for completing notable mural projects including Maestrapiece (1993), Para El Mercado (1974), and Latinoámerica.

== Career ==
Perez co-founded the Latina artist collective Las Mujeres Muralistas along with Patricia Rodríguez, Graciela Carrillo, and Consuelo Méndez. Originally, Consuelo Méndez from Venezuela was the only non-Chicana member of the muralist group. The influential group completed the majority of their work in the 1970s–1990s in the Mission District of San Francisco. Their work notably challenged male assumptions around the definitions of political art, and led to an increased use of scaffolding for female artists.

== Works ==
=== 500 Años de Resistencia (1972) ===
- Located in Balmy Alley in San Francisco's mission district, "500 Años de Resistencia", which translates to "500 Years of Native Survival", commemorates the history of indigenous perseverance through suffering in Mexico.

=== Latinoámerica (1974) ===
- Also referred to as Panámerica, this mural by Perez, Patricia Rodriguez, Consuelo Mendez, and Graciela Carillo (Las Mujeres Muralistas) is located on the exterior of the Panamerican Mission on 26th Street of San Francisco, California. The artists completed this mural while they were enrolled at San Francisco Art Institute. Latinoámerica was criticized by male Chicano artists for its absence of overt political imagery in the style of many of the male artists in the Chicano Mural Movement. The artists notably experienced street harassment while they worked on this and other murals. Although the mural was produced as a collaboration, each artist mainly worked on a specific section.
  "Maestrapeace" by Las Mujeres Muralistas

=== Maestrapeace (1993) ===
Perez is best known for her contributions to the group artwork, Maestrapiece, a five story tall mural on the side of the Women's Building in the San Francisco Mission District. She collaborated on the mural with muralists Juana Alicia, Miranda Bergman, Edythe Boone, Susan Cervantez, Meera Desai, and Yvonne Littleton, as well as over 70 volunteers. Originally intended to deter graffiti from the outside of the Women's Building, the mural was inspired by a dream of Yvonne Littleton's featuring two women reaching across to each other, the mural includes the image of Nobel Peace Prize recipient Rigoberta Menchu, activist Audre Lorde, artist Georgia O'Keeffe, Palestinian activist Hanan Ashrawi, Puerto Rican revolutionary Lolita Lebron, East Asian goddess Guanyin, Aztec moon goddess Coyolxauhqui, Yoruba goddess Yemayah, sculptor Olga Stornaouldo, and curandera Maria Sabina. Rigoberta Menchu even showed her support for the project by appearing in person at the mural's dedication in 1994. The mural was restored in 2012 by the original group of artists along with a group of community volunteers. The mural reaches up to 65 feet tall, and 192 feet long.

Perez's main contribution to the mural was the image of Coyolxauhqui, which she painted emerging out of a hand, reaching across the mural towards the goddess Yemayah. The hands were modeled after mural co-collaborator Susan Cervantez's own hands. The artists divided up their work; Susan Cervantez painted Venus and Pleiadeis at the top of the building, Juana Alicia and Perez worked underneath her, Meera Desai painted many of the culturally significant fabrics featured on the mural, and Olivia Quevedo was responsible for the calligraphy portions. Miranda Bergman painted Audre Lorde and Lilian Ngoyi. The women worked on 10 stories of scaffolding without the presence of safety equipment. Like "Latinoámerica", the mural "Maestrapeace" faced criticism for its absence of overt political imagery, however it has been called revolutionary because of the artists collective approach to the mural as well as through its broad range of subjects. Since its creation, "Maestrapeace" received recognition from Angela Davis, who wrote a foreword for the book, Maestrapeace: San Francisco's Monumental Feminist Mural by Juana Alicia, Miranda Bergman, Edythe Boone, Susan Kelk Cervantes, Meera Desai, Yvonne Littleton, and Pérez.

The mural features four distinct facades; the Lapidge Street mural, the Lapidge and 18th Street corner, the 18th Street mural, as well as an interior mural. The Lapidge Street mural features a Sami elder, Rigoberta Menchu wearing Quiche Maya huipil, the Pleiades, Yemayah, Coyolxauhqui, an Asian profile, Georgia O'Keeffe, Guanyin, dancers, Audre Lorde, Lilian Ngoyi, Hanan Ashrawi, Joycelyn Elders, Jessica Govea, Maria Sabina, Women political prisoners, Dakini and a lesbian couple, and Mithila artist with a baby. The 18th Street facade features an African profile, the goddess Aditi, a Native American profile, the image of a young Mestiza girl named Lucía, the image of a girl from Sri Lanka, a painting of a Wodaabe grandmother washing her granddaughter, as well as cultural textiles from Tibet, Guatemala, Ecuador, Mexico, and more. The Lapidge and 18th street corner of the mural features many plants and animals from all over the world.
