= Marta Ayala =

Salvadoran-American painter

Marta Ayala is a Salvadoran-American painter and a woman muralist in San Francisco. Her work involves experimenting with colors, themes, etc. She is not tied to a single theme, medium or style. The majority of her work revolves around engaging with the community by collaborating with other artists and teaching classes. She experiments with various colors and uses easily definable lines in her paintings and murals. Ayala's paintings and murals display a mix of colorful images reminiscent of childhood, earthly materials such as rocks and water with a mix of ancient culture. This is the reason for the word "primitive" to describe her work.

== Early life ==
Marta Ayala's artistic career began when she immigrated from El Salvador to San Francisco in 1968 along with her family. Ayala started producing paintings and drawings as a child. She received inspiration from her uncle Camilo Minero. He was a muralist and she followed in his footsteps. Her artwork has primitive and childlike characteristics. She is self-taught, evident from the outlines used in her images.

She attended schools throughout San Francisco and in Venezuela to further her skills.

Ayala received her college education in San Francisco. She attended San Francisco City college between 1977 and 1978. After a short break, in the years 1980–82, Ayala left San Francisco for Venezuela to study at the Art Institute of Sucre. From 1989 through 1993 she went to the Precita Eyes Mural Center to apprentice with Susan Cervantes (Latina muralist). She returned to San Francisco City college after her apprenticeship.

== Career ==
She teaches various members of the Bay area community about murals, especially children. She works with young children in a "Spanish Through Art" class. Because of the murals she painted all over the city (with contributions from others) she received Best Public Art award in San Francisco.

Ayala has contributed to the infamous Balmy Alley in the Mission District of San Francisco. Las Mujeres Muralistas paved the way for Ayala and other Latinas in the San Francisco mural movement.

== Works ==
=== Self portrait ===
This 18 × 24 inch painting was created with oil on canvas. Ayala painted herself grinning with satisfaction while her dream-like self is depicted in darker colors with a serious demeanor in the background. The style is primitive as there is a clear distinction between herself and the background.

=== Dreaming ===
Dreaming was created using charcoal. Ayala contributes to a theme that is common to many Latin American artists–dreams. In this piece, a woman is lying down dreaming of a naked angel-looking-man that the woman is drooling over. The third part of the image appears to be a heart inflamed. It is stated that Ayala is trying to depict the sin of lust. The woman seems content, but a mixed emotions flow because of the inflamed heart–portraying shame.

=== Manjushri (2001) ===
The Manjushri mural is in Balmy Alley. It shows an enlightened Buddhist creature painted with various colors surrounding the piece. Ayala uses elements from Tibetan Art with a mix of Latin American Art.

=== Waiting for 52 Excelsior (2001) ===
This public mural was created with paint on a wall. Nature and urbanism are displayed in this mural but without clear distinctions; everything flows together, symbolizing both worlds living together. The mural is located on Excelsior Avenue.

=== Garfield High Mural (2006) ===
This mural was painted on a wall at Garfield High School in Palo Alto, California. This work involved the students of the high school as instructed by Ayala. It has childlike characteristics as it was painted by children. The mural displays a small town on a grassy hill filled with butterflies full of color and flowers throughout. It irepresents the transformation of their city or hopes for transformation to a more positive and beautiful one. The cursive words above the mural read, "Latino Power Hope to Transform Our City, Our Future Community, Leadership, Our Friendships, Family."

=== Silver Avenue Family Health Center (2006) ===
The Silver Avenue Family Health Center mural is a colorful piece. The mural displays people dancing in different ways in various color schemes. This was a piece of art created with the community.

== Honors and reward ==
- Ayala has received rewards for Best Public Art in the community in years 1998 and 2001.
