= Graciela Carrillo =

American painter (born 1950)

- Born: 1950 (age 75–76); Los Angeles, California, U.S.
- Education: San Jose State University; San Francisco Art Institute

Graciela Carrillo (born in Los Angeles in 1950) is a Chicana artist and muralist in San Francisco and member of the all-female Chicana/Latina artist group Mujeres Muralistas. She is a co-founder of Galería de la Raza, a gallery utilized to showcase the everyday lives of the Chicano community through art during the Chicano Civil Rights movement through the Chicano muralist movement.

== Biography ==
=== Education ===
Graciela Carrillo attended San Jose State University when she was living in Los Angeles, California. Like her contemporary and friend, Patricia Rodriguez, Graciela Carrillo moved to San Francisco where she attended the San Francisco Art Institute in 1969 through a scholarship. She attended the art institute at the same time as Patricia Rodriguez where they eventually became roommates and ideas about their mission would surface. By being allowed to study as a Chicana woman, Carrillo was able to learn about classic mural art which enabled her to create her own mural art with Las Mujeres Muralistas where she infused her knowledge from school and her contemporaries.

=== Mission ===
Graciela Carrillo created art with ideological stances as a Chicana artist. Her letter as a response to Malaquías Montoya's essay, "A Critical Perspective in the State of Chicano Art," reveals her mission as a Chicana artist. In this letter, Graciela challenges the author's rhetorical style that is difficult to read and their Marxist and sexist perspectives that ignore Chicana artists' struggle to create art while juggling different aspects in life as a woman. Her letter to Montoya highlights her goal to deconstruct the dominant and ideal versions of art in response to gender differences and male dominated careers.

The principles behind mural-making in Las Mujeres Muralistas mural collective emphasizes the significance that collectivity has through mural making for these Chicana women. Though many art critics argue that their art is not "political enough," they highlight that their art is also for the purpose of community and children. They create art in order to bring art closer to the people in underrepresented and disenfranchised communities.

== Art ==
=== Latino-America ===
In Latino-America, Graciela Carrillo, Patricia Rodríguez, Consuelo Mendez, and Irene Pérez – and their four assistants – Tuti Rodriguez, Miriam Olivas, Xochitl Nevel-Guerrero, and Estér Hernández painted a 70 ft × 20 ft (21.3 m × 6.1 m) mural on a high wall. This mural was notable for using only and all female artists which led to the leading artists being named La Mujeres Muralistas. It was commissioned by Mission Model Cities in 1974.

=== Soñar Despierto: Seriographs and Mural Exhibit ===
From March 9, 1974, to March 31, 1974, Graciela Carrillo's art was exhibited in Galeria de la Raza's mural exhibits. Her artworks in this series represent warm and bright colors, many which represent cactuses. Her artwork represented symbols of Mexican-American culture.

=== Marzo ===
Marzo depicts an indigenous man with angel wings being guided by figures through the indigenous calendar. This art piece was created in 1975 and it was displayed in la Galeria de la Raza. Many of her works depict indigenous aspects of life.
