= Edythe Boone =

American painter

- Born: Edythe Boone; Brooklyn, New York
- Occupations: Artist, muralist
- Known for: MaestraPeace
- Notable work: "Those We Love, We Remember", "Let a Thousand Parks Bloom"
- Relatives: Eric Garner (nephew)

Edythe (Edy) Boone (born 1938), is an African-American artist and activist. She has worked as a muralist, counselor, and art teacher throughout her life in an under-served area in California.

She is the aunt of Eric Garner, an African-American man who was choked to death by New York Police Department officers. His death, along with the death of Michael Brown, led to protests and in part catalyzed the Black Lives Matter movement.

== Career ==
Boone is well known for the many murals she has painted. She started with her painted murals on each floor of a building in Harlem, New York and her work has expanded through the years to one of her most notable projects, designing and painting the Women's Building mural in San Francisco, California. She first was exposed to art when visiting her grandmother, who was a seamstress and Boone found herself surrounded by color, fabrics and textures. During the time she lived in Harlem the problem with crack cocaine was rampant and had a large influence in her artistic development. It was there that she made guerilla murals to protest the situation. It is her belief that art is for everyone, not just for professionals, aiming to empower individuals and communities through the use of art.

Boone’s reputation for being socially conscious could be said to stem from many occasion but in the past she has been influenced by many social movements such as the Black Panthers and other various civil rights movements. Boone is best known for her street murals in the San Francisco Bay Area which focus upon activist issues and the local community. Her topics have included the 1980s crack epidemic in America, AIDS, poverty, racial discrimination, and gender inequality.

== Works ==
Boone is perhaps most well-known for being one of the muralists behind the famous MaestraPeace mural on the Women's Building in San Francisco, California. The mural was created in 1994 by a cooperative of seven female artists, including Boone, Juana Alicia, Miranda Bergman, Susan Kelk Cervantes, Meera Desai, Yvonne Littleton, and Irene Perez. The mural spans two walls and is five stories high. A few of the many images on it depict the Aztec Goddess of the Moon Coyolxauhqui, Palestinian legislator and activist Hanan Ashrawi, poet and activist Audre Lorde, painter Georgia O'Keeffe, Puerto Rican revolutionary Lolita Lebrón, and Guatemalan Nobel Peace Prize winner Rigoberta Menchú. The mural is a major tourist attraction in the city's Mission District. It was restored in 2012 and Boone participated in the restoration. The building on which it is painted is a testament to women in itself as it is the first all women owned and run community building. The mural is a testament to women through the ages depicting the struggles and conflicts they have faced.

MaestraPeace is notable not only for its massive scale and the numerous famous or mythical women it depicts, but for the multicultural and anti-colonialist sentiments expressed by artists of varying backgrounds. The piece represents "transhistorical, crosscultural and transnational connections between the African and indigenous cultures of the Americas" and its multicultural feminism suits the Women's Building's purpose and location in an ethnically diverse area.

The group of artists themselves are a diverse depiction due to both nationality and sexual preference. In the group there are two Latinas, two African Americans, east Asian, two Caucasians and one Jewish lesbian, straight and bisexual. The mural depicts a symmetrical composition flanked by figures as those representing the African and Native American ethnicities.

Those We Love, We Remember, a mural to honor lost loved ones, was painted by Boone in Balmy Alley in San Francisco, CA.

In the 1980s, Boone and a group of "guerrilla" muralists worked on Oakland Wall Speaks with local housing project residents. The murals depict the effects of crack cocaine on the people who use it.

Near Berkeley's People's Park, Boone collaborated on the mural Let a Thousand Parks Bloom, an allusion to the peaceful demonstrations of 1969 that occurred in the park in protest of the Vietnam War.

She oversaw the creation in Berkeley, CA of a 100-foot mural (completed in 2018) on Ashby Avenue between Harper and Ellis Streets. The mural depicts images of people, places, and interactions representing the history of South Berkeley from the times of the Ohlone to the present.

== Documentary ==
"A New Color" is Marlene “Mo” Morris' directing debut. According to Morris, the film focuses on Edythe Boone's “illustrious career", stating “Edy has a way of inspiring people and embracing a number of causes”. The film debuted at the Mill Valley Film Festival on October 10, 2015.

Marlene Morris was a 2011 Berkeley Film Foundation grant winner for "A New Color", which allowed for half of the footage to be shot. In 2012, a Kickstarter campaign, created by Morris, raised $7,951 in additional funding for the film, while the East Bay Community Foundation pledged to match any funds that were raised.

=== Film Festivals Appearances ===
Year	Festival	Awards
2015	Mill Valley Film Festival	MVFF Audience Favorite, Special Mention
2016	Peace on Earth Film Festival	Best Short Documentary
