= The Women's Building (San Francisco) =

- U.S. National Register of Historic Places
- San Francisco Designated Landmark
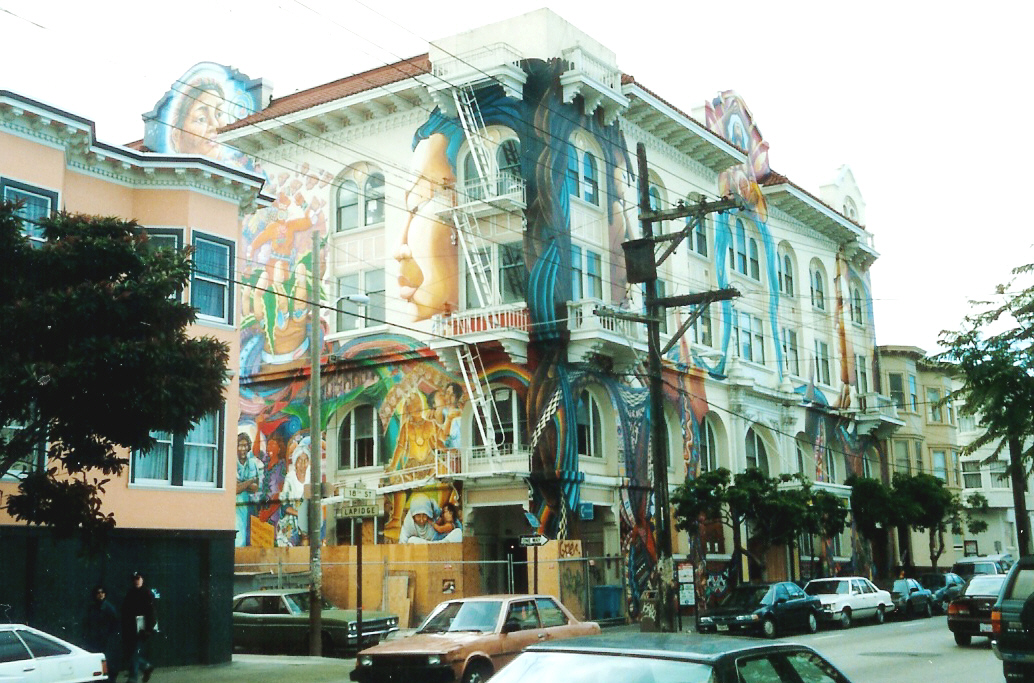
- The front of the San Francisco Women's Building in 2006.
- Location: 3543-18th Street, San Francisco, California, United States, U.S.
- Coordinates: 37.761420°N 122.422619°W
- Built: 1910
- Architect: August Reinhold Denke
- NRHP reference No.: 100002359
- SFDL No.: 178

Significant dates
- Added to NRHP: April 30, 2018
- Designated SFDL: March 1, 1985

The Women's Building is a women-led non-profit arts and education community center located in San Francisco, California. The center advocates self-determination, gender equality and social justice. The four-story building rents to multiple tenants and serves more than 20,000 women a year. The building has served as an event and meeting space since 1979, when it was purchased by the San Francisco Women's Center. The Center is shielded from rising real estate costs in the Mission District because it owns the building free and clear, having paid off the mortgage in 1995.

The building has been listed on the National Register of Historic Places since April 30, 2018, under the name "The Women's Building". It has been listed as a San Francisco Designated Landmark since March 1, 1985.

== History of The Women's Building ==
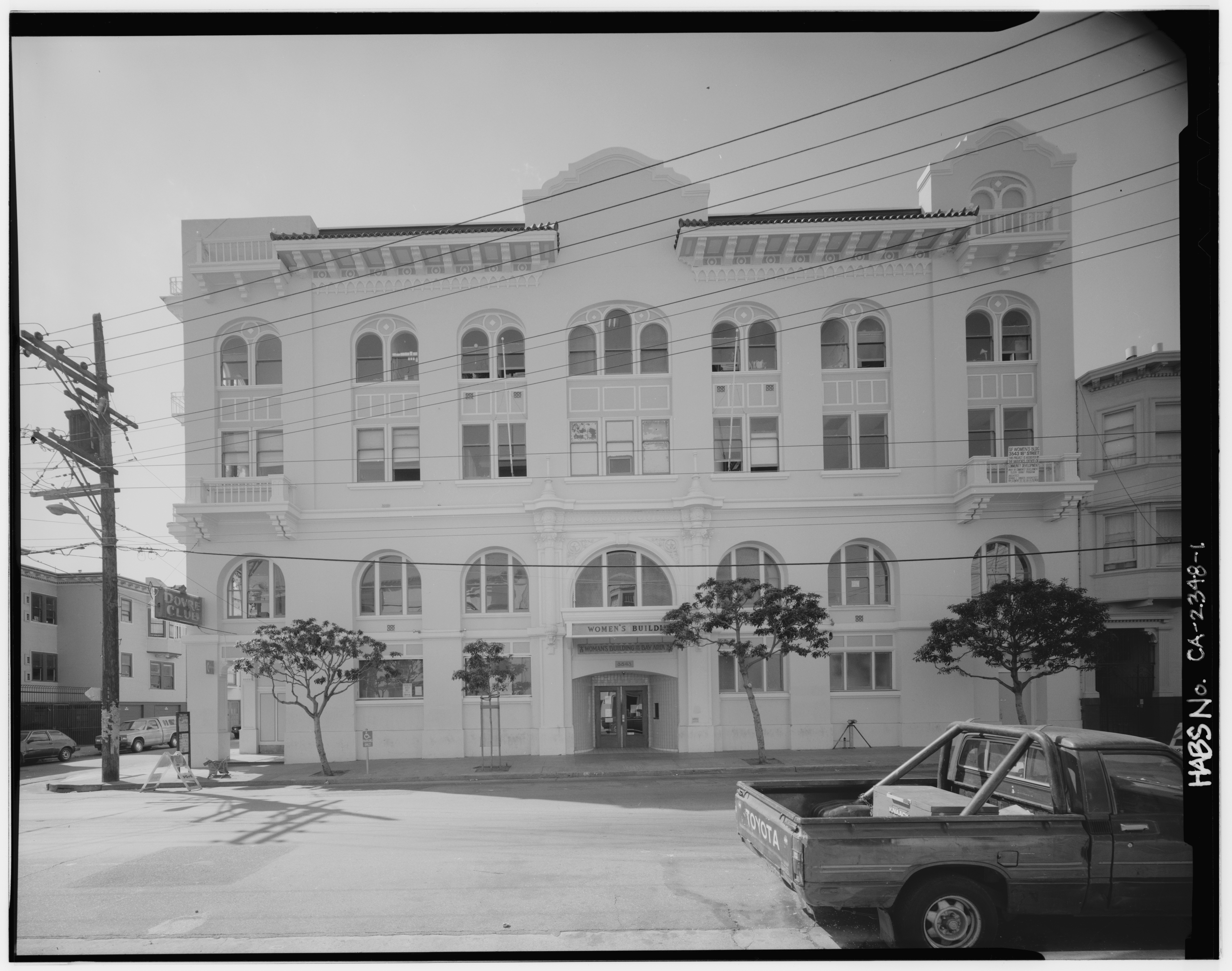
The Women's Building (1993)

The four-story structure was built in 1910 by architect August Reinhold Denke, for the German Turnverein exercise movement. It retained the name Mission Turn Hall until 1935. Other organizations associated with various national or ethnic groups have also used the building, such as the Native Sons and Daughters of the Golden West. It also known as the Mission Turn-Verein Hall.

In 1935, the building was acquired by the Sons and Daughters of Norway, and was renamed as Dovre Hall. It received its current name in 1978 after being acquired by the Women's Center.

== Background of Women's Center ==
The San Francisco Women's Center was organized in 1973. By 1974, the group hired its first full-time employee and had moved into a small storefront office. In 1976, difficulty in locating a venue for the national conference on Violence Against Women, which it was organizing with other women's groups, led the Center to search for a permanent space. Through 1978 and 1979, it raised funds to put down an initial $10,000 deposit, and then a $115,000 first payment toward the $535,000 purchase price of the building at 3543 18th Street.

"Becoming Visible: The First Black Lesbian Conference" was held at The Women's Building, from October 17 to 19, 1980. It has been credited as the first conference for African-American lesbian women.

Tracy Gary, one of the organizers of the Violence Against Women conference, and co-founder of The Women's Building, along with co-founder Marya Grambs and Women's Building staff member Carmen Vázquez, were interviewed in 1982 by Julia Randall for KPFA in recognition of the center's 3rd year of operations. The women discussed the difficulties of the early years and how the building was being used in 1982. Roma Guy and her partner Diane Jones were also among The Women's Building's co-founders.

In the first year of operation, The Women's Building was subject to two attacks: an arson fire that caused $50,000 worth of damage, and a pipe bomb set off on the front steps of the building.

In 1997, The Women's Building began to undergo a $5 million renovation prompted by mandatory seismic retrofitting to meet city standards. In the course of that effort, it evicted the Dovre Club, an Irish bar that had been in the corner of the building on 18th and Lapidge streets since 1979. The original owner of that bar had an oral agreement with the Women's Center that the bar could stay in place during his lifetime; after his death in 1997, the bar made an effort to remain but ultimately relocated.

In 2018, the Center received a $160,000 grant to retrofit the building's windows, after winning preservation funding in a contest for historical buildings.

== MaestraPeace (1994) mural ==
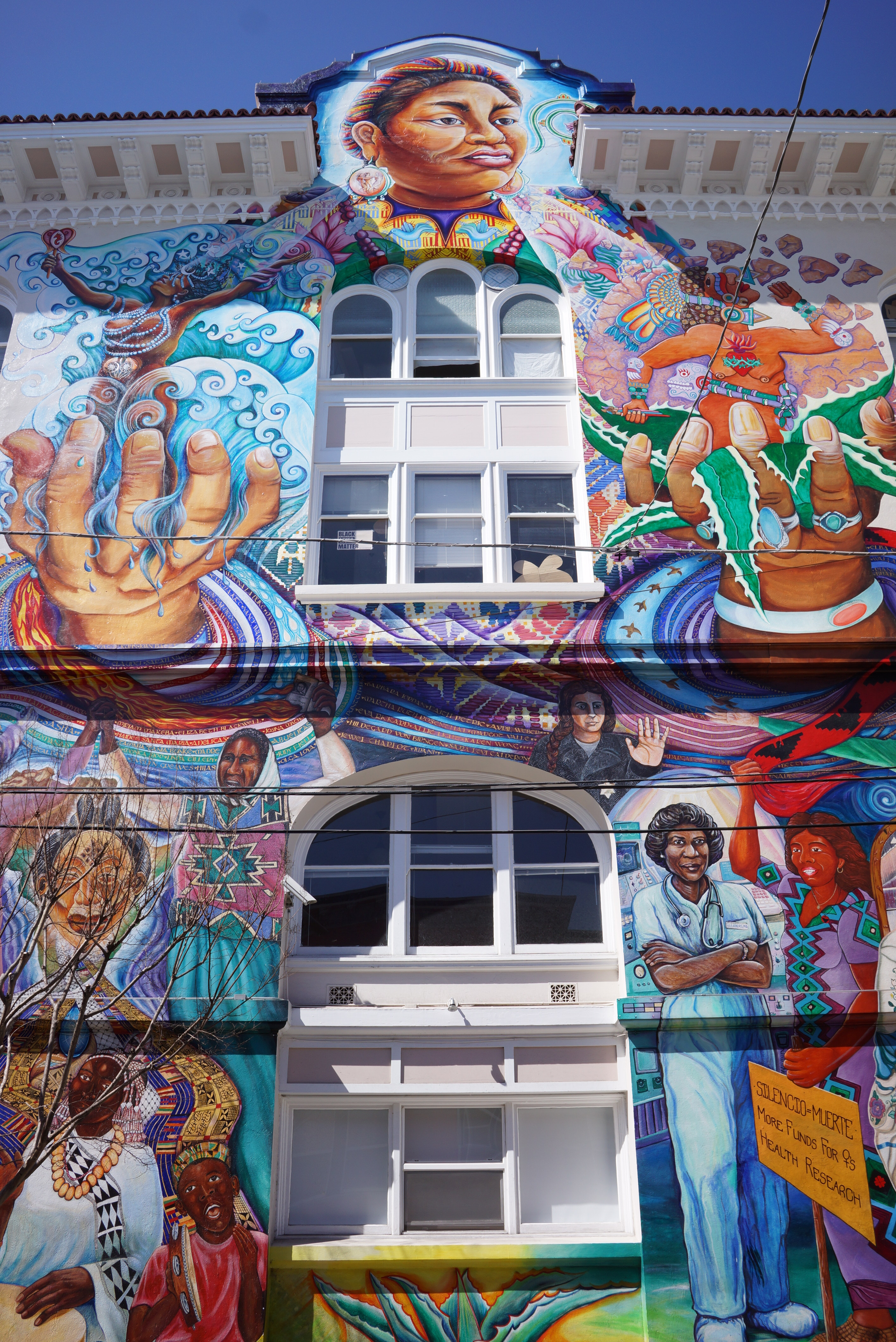
Part of the mural on the side of the building, in 2015

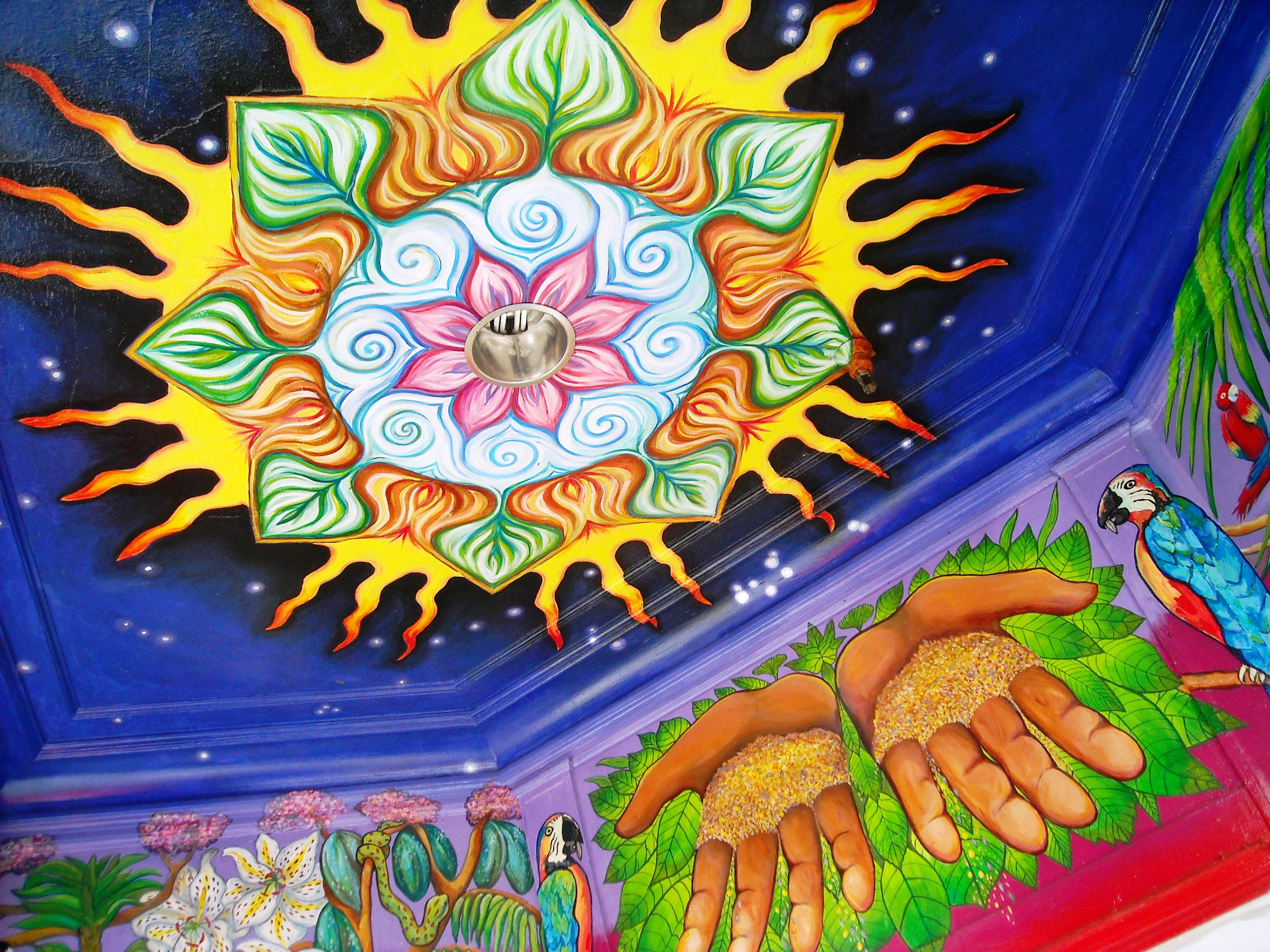
The Women's Building

A mural titled MaestraPeace (1994) covers the outside of The Women's Building as well as the interior entrance hall and stairway. It was painted by women artists, including Juana Alicia, Miranda Bergman, Edythe Boone, Susan Kelk Cervantes (cofounder of Precita Eyes Muralists Association), Meera Desai, Yvonne Littleton, and Irene Perez, along with their helpers and volunteers. It features images of female icons from history and fiction, and the names of more than 600 women written in calligraphy. According to the San Francisco Women's Center, "This spectacular mural is a culmination of a multi-cultural, multi-generation collaboration of seven women artists, and a colorful work of art that sings to our community."

Many of the original artists returned to the building for an update in 2000, an expansion to the inside of the building in 2010, and a major $130,000 restoration in 2012. That last restoration included a treatment process designed to preserve the colors of the mural for another 100 years.

== See also ==
- Mujeres Muralistas
- National Register of Historic Places listings in San Francisco
