= Balmy Alley =

Street in San Francisco, California

Coordinates: 37°45′06″N 122°24′45″W

Balmy Alley (formally Balmy Street) is a one-block-long secondary back alley that is home to a concentrated collection of murals in the city of San Francisco. It is located in the south central portion of the Inner Mission District in the Calle 24 Latino Cultural District between 24th Street, and 25th Street at Garfield Square. Since 1973, most fences and garage doors on the street have been decorated with a mural. Buildings whose primary entrance is on Balmy Alley are less decorated.

== History ==
The earliest murals in the alley date to 1972, painted by Mia Galivez and children in a local child care center. Artists Patricia Rodriquez and Graciela Carillo had rented an apartment on Balmy Alley and painted their first mural in the Alley, a jungle-underwater scene, in 1973. Their two-woman team soon expanded and became known as Las Mujeres Muralistas. Fellow member Irene Perez painted her own mural on the alley in 1973, depicting two back-to-back figures painting flutes.

In 1984, in a second significant wave of murals in the alley, "Ray" (Raymond Michael) Patlán spearheaded the PLACA (People's Legal Assistance for Community Art) project to install murals throughout the alley featuring the common theme of a celebration of indigenous Central American cultures and a protest of US intervention in Central America. Topics of the murals included the Nicaraguan revolution, Óscar Romero, and the Guatemalan civil war. This culminated in the addition of twenty-seven murals during the summer of 1985, funded in part by a grant of $2,500 from the Zellerbach Foundation. This art project proved influential, inspiring the La Lucha Continua Art Park/La Lucha Mural Park in New York City the following year.

Painting continues regularly in the alley, including new murals about gentrification and police harassment in 2012 and a restoration of one of the PLACA murals in 2014.

Besides those listed above, artists who have produced murals in the alley include Juana Alicia, Susan Kelk Cervantes, Marta Ayala, Brooke Francher, Miranda Bergman, Osha Neuman, Neil Mackinnon, Carlos Loarca, Xochitl Nevel-Guerrero, and Sirron Norris.

== Influence ==
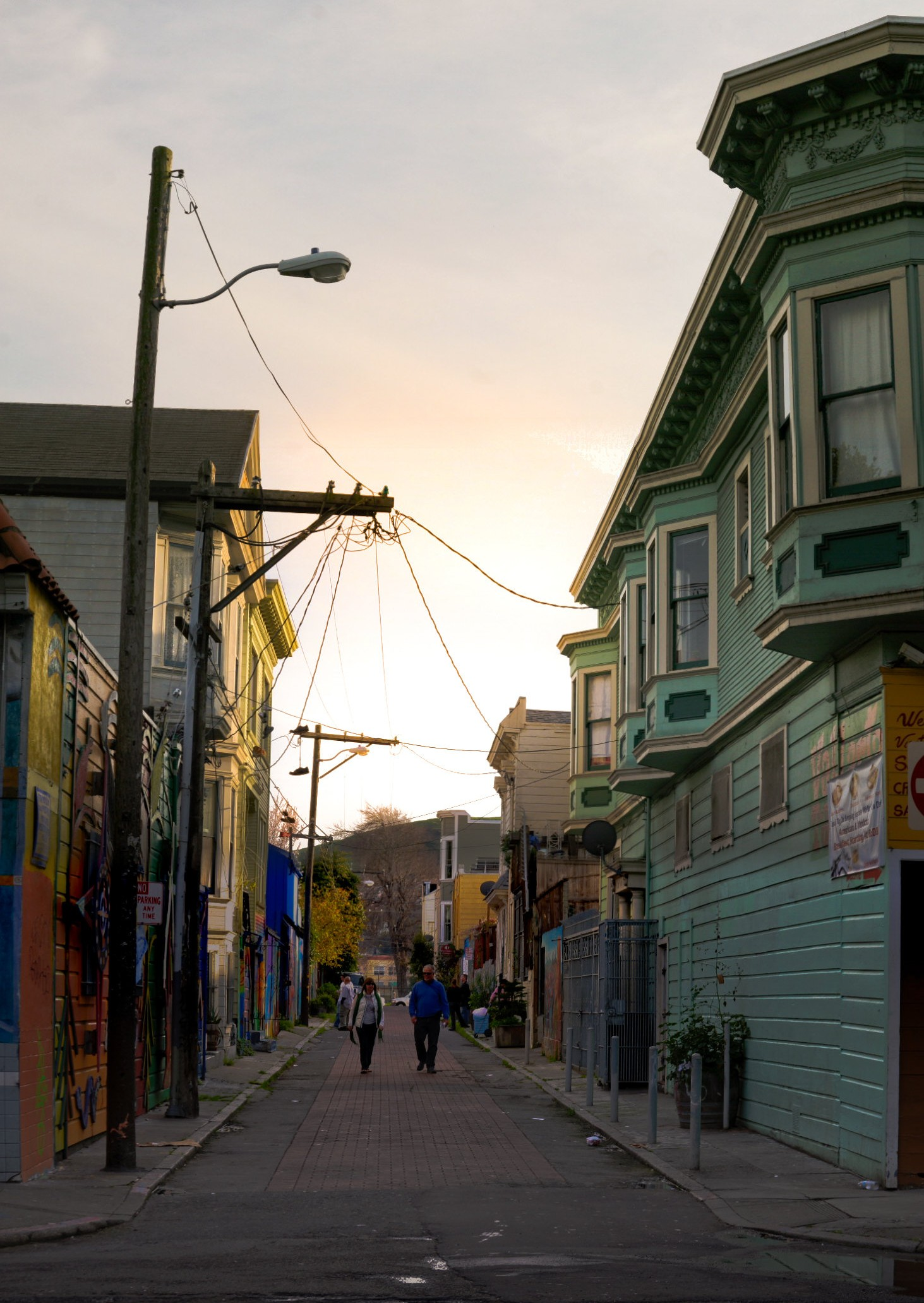
Balmy Alley looking south from 24th Street towards Bernal Heights.

The Balmy Alley murals have been described, along with San Diego's Chicano Park and Los Angeles' Estrada Courts, as a leading example of mural environments that reclaim spaces for Chicanos and give expression to a history of Chicano displacement and marginalization.

The mural grouping in the alley is internationally recognized, both as an exemplar of activist art and as a tourist destination.

== Context ==
The Mission District has San Francisco's densest concentration of murals, often along political themes, sometimes described jointly as the "Mission School" of muralism. Balmy Alley is often cited as the leading concentration within the Mission.

Other mural groupings nearby

- Lucky Street (37.7516802,-122.41345)
- Cypress Street (37.7515154,-122.4167762)
- Cypress Street (37.7497773,-122.4166116)
- Lilac Street (37.7515221,-122.4178318)
- Lilac Street (37.7498871,-122.4176731)
- Osage Street (37.7524643,-122.4190715)
- Osage Street (37.7498062,-122.4188132)
- Osage Street (37.7497175,-122.4188055)
- Orange Alley (37.7516545,-122.420059)
- Orange Alley (37.7500914,-122.4199179)
- Poplar Street (37.7524007,-122.4211959)
- Poplar Street (37.7512524,-122.4210828)
- Poplar Street (37.7494432,-122.4209107)
- Horace Street (37.7500813,-122.414446)

== See also ==
- Precita Eyes, a mural arts education group, located near Balmy Alley
- Clarion Alley, another mural grouping by local artists, 1.3 miles away, inspired by Balmy Alley.
