= Patricia Rodriguez (artist) =

American artist (born 1944)

- Born: 1944 (age 81–82); Marfa, Texas, U.S.
- Education: Merritt College, San Francisco Art Institute, San Francisco State University (MFA)
- Occupations: Visual artist, educator

Patricia Rodriguez (born 1944) is an American Chicana artist and educator. Rodriguez grew up in Marfa, Texas and moved to San Francisco to later pursue an art degree at Merritt College and this is where she learned about the Mexican American Liberation Art Front (MALA-F) and the Chicano Movement. In 1970, Patricia received a scholarship to the San Francisco Art Institute and this is where she met Graciela Carrillo. Together, they created and founded the Mujeres Muralistas, the first Chicana women's mural collective in San Francisco.

== Early life ==
Patricia Rodriguez was born in Marfa, Texas in 1944. She was born to a Chicana single parent and was raised by her grandmother while her mother worked. Her grandmother played a major role in the development of a feminine identification. Rodriguez grew her creative identity by attending jamaycas (festive days) which provided an acceptable method of feminine creativity. Later, Rodriguezand her family moved to California and this helped Rodriguez learn a new sense about cultural boundaries. Back in Texas, Rodriguez wouldn't hang out with Anglos unless they were poor or were from the same neighborhood, but in California, there wasn't a division and they hung out together. In junior high, Rodriguez began to formulate herself as an artist. She had an art teacher that encouraged her to become an artist and to go to college. The limitations and social attitudes were an obstacle for Patricia's future, but she relied on her endurance and perseverance.

== Education ==
Rodriguez began to pursue an art degree at Merritt College in 1966 where she discovered the Chicano movements. In 1970, she received a scholarship and attended the San Francisco Art Institute. She found art school to be isolating and chaotic and it wasn't what she expected. Rodriguez was happy and excited to be accepted to such a prestigious art school but she didn't want to be a minimalist painter at the time like everyone else. She wanted to paint with a lot of color. She joined Chicano movement groups to fight for their right for higher education and through this momentum, she developed herself more as an artist. Her support was restricted by the political expectations of her male counterparts. While attending San Francisco Art Institute, Rodriguez met and roomed with Graciela Carrillo where they rented an apartment on Balmy Alley. Balmy Alley is home to the most concentrated collection of murals in the city of San Francisco. Rodriguez started to study Mexican muralists and became inspired to create a women's artist group. Rodriguez and Carrillo created Las Mujeres Muralistas (The Women Muralists) in 1974. They added more members to their group: Consuelo Mendez, a Venezuelan-born artist in the printmaking program and Irene Pérez, a Chicana graphic artist.

== Mujeres Muralistas ==
The Bay Area was an important epicenter for student movement groups in the early 70s but for the Mujeres Muralistas, it was a frustrating time. They were the only Latinas at the Art Institute and they lacked support and role models. Las Mujeres Muralistas began to talk about art and the roles it played in each other's lives. The women were aware of the muralist movements beginning in San Francisco but were never invited to participate in projects because of the male exclusivity. Murals began to show up on Balmy Alley, where Rodriguez and Carrillo's apartment was. So in 1973, Rodriguez and Graciela initiated their own mural on a garage across from their apartment. Since they didn't have money to spend, they got scaffolding from the Arts Commission and the paint was donated by the neighbors. The response was overwhelmingly positive even though there were those who told them to quit.

Later that year, Irene Perez painted her own mural on Balmy Alley. She wanted her mural to make a statement against the political imagery shown in the majority of the other murals in the Mission District. This expanded version of political art that included nature, culture, and family characterized the work of Las Mujeres Muralistas.

In 1973, Rodriguez was asked to paint a mural at the James Town Community Center for children in San Francisco's Latino Mission district. Rodriguez approached Consuelo Mendez to help collaborate on the mural. As the group became more publicized and recognized, they inspired and recruited more members to their group. These women include: Ester Hernandez, Miriam Olivo, Ruth Rodriguez, and Susan Cervantez.

Significant for Las Mujeres Muralistas was their open challenge to paint murals outdoors and in public. Male Chicano artists supported their work, but the men passing by often harassed them while passing the worksite. Also in 1973, Mendez was commissioned to make a mural for the Mission Model Cities building. She enlisted Rodriguez, Carrillo, and Perez to help her. For the first time, they had a small budget. They agreed that the mural should be very colorful and should send a positive message about Latino culture. Each focused on different concepts and Rodriguez focused on imagery from Bolivia and Peru. They had to share the space effectively and they worked together to create this 20x75 foot mural. The mural was a tribute to the culture of Latin America referencing many countries. Even before the mural was completed, it was received the community's and media's attention. People from around the area would come to look at it and everyone was shocked to learn that the muralists were women. The mural became well known and it helped the Mujeres Muralistas to be taken more seriously. With the finished mural called Latinoamerica, this would be the first and last time the core group of Carrillo, Mendez, Perez, and Rodriguez would work on a mural together. Other murals would only be worked on but only by a few of the members. Las Mujeres Muralistas helped develop a reputation for Latin American artists and they hold a significant place in Chicano art history.

=== Latinoamerica ===
Latinoamerica is a mural created by the Mujeres Muralistas which included Rodriguez, Carrillo, Consuelo Mendez, and Irene Perez.

Latinoamerica, created and completed in 1974, is the first mural created for the public by the Mujeres Muralistas and it is considered their most popular. The mural is located in San Francisco on Mission and 25th street. Latinoamerica was Rodriguez's way to introduce the Mujeres Muralistas to the community as muralists. Rodriguez and the rest of the women in the Mujeres Muralistas painted murals like Latinoamerica in sections to allow all of them to express their experiences and perspectives. Latinoamerica represents different aspects of the Latinx community that came from the members of the Mujeres Muralistas; conventional images from Bolivia and Peru by Rodriguez, imagery from Venezuela and family by Mendez, Aztec heritage by Carrillo, and cornstalk and magueys by Perez. The mural depicts, from left to right, llamas native to the Andes in South America, Peruvian pipe players, Yare devils from Venezuela, a family inside an Indian sun, a tuiuiu bird from Brazil, a Bolivian diablada figure, and an Aztecan fifth sun shining over a princess and warrior figure, all framed by cornstalk. The mural is inclusive to the residents of the community by representing different countries that the residents have a special connection to such as Mexico, Bolivia, Venezuela, Peru, Brazil, and Guatemala. The mural represents people (especially women and children), landscape, and cultural traditions from Latin America. Latinoamerica is described as an “ode to life” because it combines the spiritual, human, natural dimension of the different cultures from the people of the Mission District (the community of the Mujeres Muralistas). Rodriguez and the rest of the Mujeres Muralistas used Latinoamerica to acknowledge and represent themselves and the people in their Chicanx/Latinx community, especially the women whom are underrepresented.

== Late life and career ==
In 1975, Rodriguez was invited to teach at the University of California, Berkeley in the Chicano Studies Department. She was the first Chicana artist to teach in the UC system and she created the first Chicano Art History course at UC Berkeley. Rodriguez taught at various universities and colleges in the Bay Area.

In the 1980s, Rodriguez created a large body of art box constructions for exhibitions that traveled all over the U.S. and abroad.

In 1990, Rodriguez taught at the Institute for American Indian Arts in Santa Fe, New Mexico as a printmaker. After teaching for a year, she fell in love with New Mexico and stayed for six years. She taught at UNM-Los Alamos part-time and had a full-time job as a student advisor. Rodriguez also taught at the Espanola Community college in New Mexico where she painted murals with the youth. In 1997, Rodriguez moved back to California to teach at California State University, Monterey Bay and in 1998, she started classes at San Francisco State University for her Master of Fine Arts (MFA) credits.

From 2001–2009, Rodriguez worked as a gallery coordinator as the Mission Cultural Center for Latino Arts in San Francisco. She helped artists from abroad exhibit their works in the gallery where she was a curator.

Rodriguez teaches part-time and is partially retired, she still continues to work with youth in a screen printing teaching position and Laney College in Oakland, California. She also enjoys writing articles about the art experiences she has had in her life.
