= Patricia Rodríguez =

Patricia Rodríguez may refer to:

- Patricia Rodriguez (artist) (born 1944), American Chicana artist and educator
- Patricia Rodríguez (athlete) (born 1970), Colombian sprinter
- Patricia Rodríguez (model) (born 1990), Spanish actress, model and beauty queen
