= Tongo Eisen-Martin =

American poet and activist

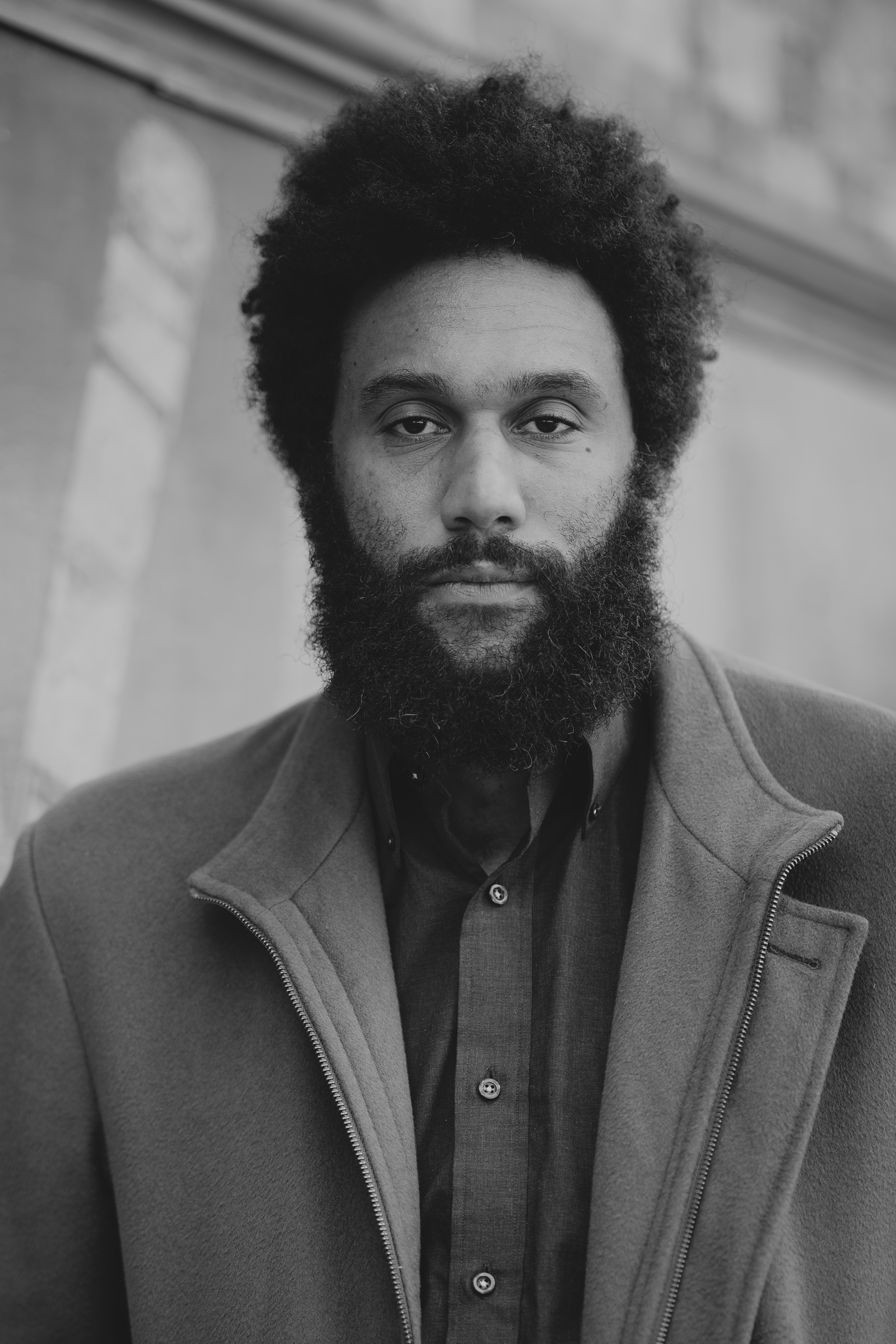
Tongo Eisen-Martin in 2021

Tongo Eisen-Martin is an American poet and activist. He was the eighth poet laureate of San Francisco, California, from 2021 to 2024.

== Biography ==
Tongo Eisen-Martin was born in 1980 in San Francisco, California to anti-imperialist, Arlene Eisen. His parents named him after Josiah Tongogara. Muralist Miranda Bergman is his godmother. He has a younger brother named Biko, and they both attended Meadows-Livingstone school in San Francisco as children. He earned a bachelor's and master's degree in African-American Studies, both from Columbia University, where he taught at the Institute for Research in African-American Studies, creating the 2012 curriculum We Charge Genocide Again! He has also taught at detention centers, including San Quentin and Rikers Island. He is the co-founder of Black Freighter Press.

== Honors and awards ==
Eisen-Martin's 2017 book Heaven Is All Goodbyes published by City Lights won a PEN Oakland Award, the 2018 American Book Award, 2018 California Book Award, and 2018 National California Booksellers Association Poetry Book of the Year. His 2020 title Blood on the Fog published by City Lights was named a Best Poetry Book of 2021 by Elisa Gabbert of the New York Times.

== Works ==
- Someone's Dead Already. Bootstrap Press. 2015. ISBN 9780988610835
- Heaven Is All Goodbyes. City Lights. 2017. ISBN 9780872867451
- Waiting Behind Tornados for Food. Materials. 2020.
- Blood on the Fog: Pocket Poets Series, No. 62: Tongo Eisen-Martin. City Lights. 2021. ISBN 9780872868755
