= Xochitl Nevel Guerrero =

American visual artist (born 1954)

Xochitl Nevel Guerrero (born 1954) is a Chicana visual and public artist who specializes in making murals, paintings, gourd decorations, masks, and mosaic/tile art.

== Early life and education ==
Xochitl Nevel Guerrero was born in 1954 in Berkeley, California, but was raised in Oakland. She was the youngest child in her family of six children. Her father, Raymundo "Zala" Nevel, came to the United States from Mexico City as part of the Bracero Program and settled in West Oakland, where he met Nevel Guerrero's mother. He was also a muralist, and it is because of him that Nevel Guerrero became fascinated by art.

Nevel Guerrero had a traumatic experience at the age of eleven that made her contemplate suicide at the age of thirteen. To cope with this, she started making art full of bright colors, changed her name, and began working in the community. She got a summer job around the ages of fourteen and fifteen that allowed her to work with children, where she learned she wanted to create a safe space for others to express themselves in artistic forms.

Nevel-Guerrero joined baile folklórico and learned to play the flute because of her parents' love for music and dancing. Since her father was active in the social movements of the time, she became involved as well. She joined a theater group called El Teatro Triste, where she performed skits that had political or social critiques.

At Laney College, she joined a theater group called El Teatro Calcetin, where she continued to represent and be involved in the community while making statements about current events. Nevel Guerrero became part of the Mujeres Muralistas where she connected culture, environment, and gender into her art.

After Laney College, she transferred to the University of California, Berkeley, dropping out after a year. She took a gap year and enrolled at Cal State East Bay (formerly known as CSU Hayward), where she earned a bachelor's degree.

== Works ==
=== Latino America ===
Latino America was a mural project coordinated by the Mujeres Muralistas in 1974. Together with artists Ester Hernández and others, Nevel Guerrero completed this mural on the Mission Model Cities building in San Francisco, California. She painted much of the maize. Her dreams of a corn goddess inspire her to include corn in many of her works.

=== La Clínica de la Raza Mural ===
In 1977, Nevel Guerrero and her father painted this mural at the Clínica de la Raza in East Oakland, California. It depicts indigenous peoples and symbols as well as Mexican cultural elements, such as the Virgin of Guadalupe and a curandera healing a man laying face down.

=== Youth of the World, Let's Create a Better World ===
This mural was painted by Xochitl Nevel Guerrero and Crystal Nevel, along with the PLACA group, in 1984. A young man is holding the world in his arms with others around him. Those surrounding him are expressing themselves creatively through painting, breakdancing, and more.
