= NNCL =

NNCL may refer to:

- National Negro Labor Council – American advocacy group dedicated to serving the needs and civil rights of Black workers
- Nazis and Nazi Collaborators (Punishment) Law – Israeli criminal law
