= Mujeres Muralistas =

Artist collective

Las Mujeres Muralistas ("The Muralist Women") were an all-female Latina artist collective based in the Mission District in San Francisco in the 1970s. They created a number of public murals throughout the San Francisco Bay Area, and are said to have sparked the beginning of the female muralist movement in the US and Mexico. Their murals were colorful and large scale and often focused on themes such as womanhood, culture, beauty, and socio-political change. Patricia Rodriguez, Graciela Carrillo, Consuelo Mendez, and Irene Perez are recognized as the founders and most prominent members of the collective, but other female Chicana artists assisted along the way and even joined later on, such as Susan Cervantes, Ester Hernandez, and Miriam Olivo among others.

Las Mujeres Muralistas was one of the first mural art groups in the Mission District in San Francisco, reacting against the contemporary Chicano Art Movement which had been a male dominated movement. Las Mujeres Muralistas established their unique style in 1973. At this time women artists were at work painting murals but not as a collective. Chicano art was, from its very beginning, an art of protest, connected to social politics and the labor movement and concerned with creating distinctive work that reflected the Mexican experience in the United States. Member, Ester Hernández, went on to be credited with creating one of the first images to link the plight of farmworkers to the effects on consumers and the environment with her screenprint, Sun Mad, 1981. Groups of women artists of color, like Las Mujeres Muralistas, protested marginalization on the basis of gender, race and ethnicity. A few other Chicano Muralist groups in Northern California during the 1970's were Galeria de la Raza, Royal Chicano Air Force, and Brocha de Valle.

== History ==
The Mujeres Muralistas got their start in the early 1970s. Patricia Rodriguez and Graciela Carrillo were college students studying at the San Francisco Art Institute. In an interview, Rodriguez recalled being unsatisfied with the education she was receiving at the Institute as it primarily revolved around the minimalist movement. She was a fan of using more color. Eventually she teamed up with Carrillo, and later Mendez and Perez, to form their all female artist group.

At this time, the Mission District was predominantly Latino (around 45% of the neighborhood was Latino according to a 1970 census) and the Muralistas were hugely inspired by the Chicano Movement and the cultures of their community. There were other muralists working in the Mission District at the time, but they were the first females to step onto the scene. The male artists, drawing from the imagery of Los Tres Grandes, often painted murals about violence, war, and revolutionary figures, but the Muralistas were not interested in such aggressively political paintings. They focused on portraying their culture, the beauty of Chicana/Latina-American womanhood, and the diverse range of Latinidad in the community.

== Murals ==
=== Latinoamerica (1974) ===
Their first publicly commissioned mural was called "Latinoamerica", located on Mission Street and 25th Street, and painted for the Mission Model Cities organization. They were tasked with creating a mural that would represent the Latino culture of the area. To accomplish this, they used a lot of symbolism that was relevant to Latinos in their mural, such as a pyramid of cornstalks illustrating the significant role that corn played in the lives of indigenous American peoples.

The mural Latinoamérica helps to connect Latinos to their culture and teach future generations more about their cultural roots. Some culturally significant symbols found in the mural include an Aztec eagle and ancestors; this homage to Latin American mythology bridged a connection between the Latino community and their "indigenous past as a form of cultural empowerment." San Francisco's Mission District was home to a large and diverse group of Latinos, whom the Mujeres Muralistas acknowledged in their mural. Alongside Latinos native to the United States, Latinoamérica extended its representation to Latinos from nations such as Bolivia, Venezuela, and Peru. The mural recognized and honored Latinos from both North America and South America in efforts to foster a "pan-Latino identity." Much like the Mission District, the Murjeres Muralistas had a diverse group of Latinas, their unique cultural and national identities influencing their stylistic contributions to Latinoamérica. According to Latinas in the United States, set: A Historical Encyclopedia, edited by Vicki L. Ruiz and Virginia Sánchez Korrol, common themes underlying the work of many Latina artists were those of "human welfare and social justice." Artwork, for example, would depict people performing daily jobs and tasks, often focusing on the working class (e.g. farm workers and laborers). In fact, Latinoamérica "[drew] inspiration from the role that Latinas [played] in the labor force." In particular, the portrayal of women and children in Latinoamérica was the Mujeres Muralistas' way of redefining Latino murals, celebrating the Latino community with vibrant images instead of recreating the dark "'blood and guts' aesthetic" painted by their male counterparts.

=== Para El Mercado (1974) ===
The Muralistas were recruited to create a mural on the side of Paco's Tacos, a restaurant on the corner of 24th and South Van Ness. A McDonald's had just been built across the street, so the mural on the Paco's Tacos building was an effort to keep the restaurant unique and relevant compared to its new competitor. This mural featured four large women surrounded by an abundance of colorful fruits, animals, and exotic natural landscapes. The group chose to focus the mural around the theme of food and the concept of the Latin American marketplace. The theme felt fitting to them given that the wall mural was located on the side of a restaurant.

=== Fantasy for Children (1975) ===
Fantasy for Children is the only mural created by the Muralistas that is still standing and can still be seen today. They were commissioned to make the mural for the 24th Street Minipark. Because it was a space for children, they wanted to use the mural to make the park's environment more friendly and appealing to families so it would be used more. They considered the kind of people that would engage with the space and the final product was extremely colorful and had a lot of symbolism tying back to the Latino culture, such as a female sun acting as a sort of Mother Nature type goddess and a woman blowing wind in the top lefthand corner that appeared to be of Mayan descent. Although the mural can still be seen today, it is in need of restoration.

=== Maestrapeace (1994) ===
The Maestrapeace mural is located at The Women's Building (San Francisco), and was created in 1994 by a group of women artists. Susan Cervantes and Irene Pérez, members of the Mujeres Muralistas artist collective contributed to this mural, along with other artists such as Miranda Bergman, Edythe Boone, Yvonne Littleton, Juana Alicia, and Meera Desai. The mural is meant to reflect The Women's Building's goal of being a place where women can "heal, be safe, and strategize." The mural was designed to recognize women who have made impacts and contributions to women's history. The artwork pays tribute to historical figures like Audre Lorde and Rigoberta Menchú who are feminists and human rights activists. The mural also showcases various deities and cultural icons. Its purpose is to bring women's stories to public view, celebrate these women's achievements, and pose as a symbol of The Women's Building's continuing commitment to community support and being an advocate for women.

== Media attention ==
Prominent Mujeres Muralista artist Patricia Rodriguez has commented on the group's work saying, "The statements that we made were very feminine and we got a lot of criticism because we weren't doing soldiers with guns, weren't doing revolutionary figures. We were painting women. Women in the marketplace, women breastfeeding, women doing art. People got really angry that we were doing that. 'How could you do this when there's so much going on?' but we were saying that being a woman is a revolution in society."
