= Precita Eyes =

Community based nonprofit

Precita Eyes Muralists Association
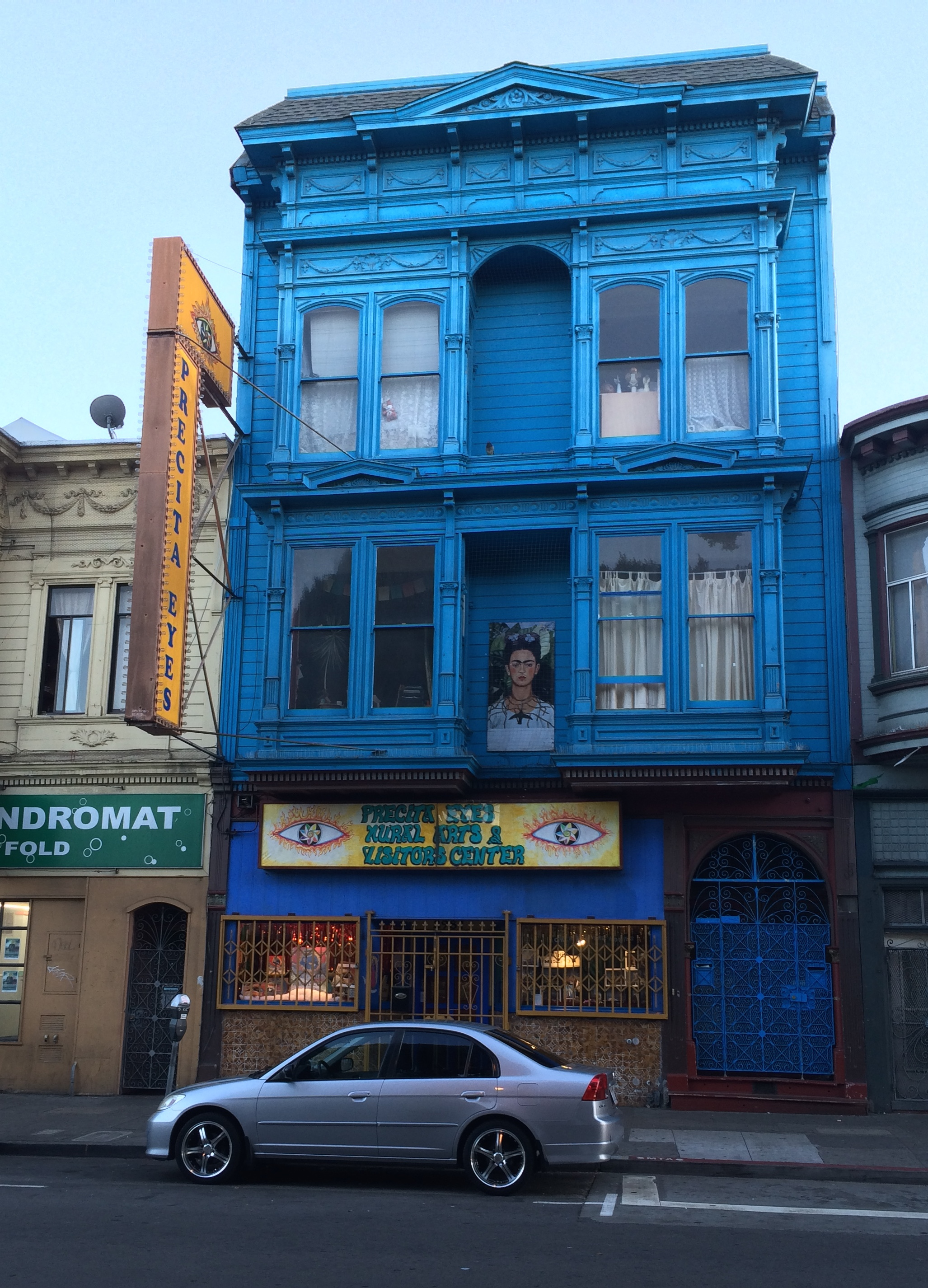
- Precita Eyes Mural Arts and Visitors Center
- Founded: 1977
- Founder: Susan and Luis Cervantes
- Type: Mural Arts Charity 501(c)(3)
- Purpose: Collaborative Mural Arts, Neighborhood Improvement and Arts Education
- Location(s): Precita Eyes Mural Arts and Visitors Center; 2981 24th Street, SF, CA; Precita Eyes Mural Arts Center; 348 Precita Avenue, SF, CA
- Origins: Mural Art Movement
- Region served: San Francisco, Bay Area, National, and International
- Key people: Founder and Executive Director; Susan Cervantes
- Website: www.precitaeyes.org

Precita Eyes Muralists Association is a community-based nonprofit muralist and arts education group located in the Bernal Heights neighborhood of San Francisco, California. It was founded in 1977 by Susan and Luis Cervantes.

== History ==
Precita Eyes Muralists Association was founded in 1977 by Susan and Luis Cervantes, who had come to the Bay Area several years before and started a family. Susan Cervantes was inspired by Las Mujeres Muralistas, the first all-women group of collaborative muralists. Cervantes adopted the Mujeres uralists' philosophy of collaborative, accessible, community art.

The organization evolved from a community mural workshop in which the participants designed and painted the mural “Masks of God, Soul of Man” for the Bernal Heights Library. The group signed the piece as Precita Eyes Muralists because the project was a collaborative effort. The name of the organization comes from the fact that most of the muralists were from Precita Valley, which gets its name from Precita Creek. Precita is a diminutive form of the Spanish word ‘presa,’ which means dam; the word ‘Precita’ means little dam. The ‘Eyes’ in the name are what we perceive the visual world with, our own eyes.

After the first mural, the group of artists continued to be interested in creating murals. They completed two major mural commissions and several more portable murals. Two years later, the group applied for non-profit status in 1979. In 1998 Precita Eyes expanded its operations with the purchase of the building at 2981 24th Street, near the well-known Balmy Alley. As of 2007, Precita Eyes had supported nearly 100 murals in the Mission neighborhood,

Precita Eyes celebrated its 30th anniversary in 2007 and continues to conduct several mural projects each year. Recent projects include two international projects, one in Beijing, China and the other in parts of the West Bank and Lebanon. Other recent local projects involved the restoration of two San Francisco Parks, Excelsior Playground and Crocker-Amazon Playground. They also host an annual Urban Youth Arts Festival, with artists painting on boards in Precita Park.

Murals are an expression of the culture of the neighborhood; in an article about Precita Eyes, muralist Juana Alicia Montoya said "In the 1960s and '70s, the Mission District became the cultural heart of the Chicano movement in California... and the murals were an integral part of that movement, as was theater and poetry." The book Chicana and Chicano Art: ProtestArte says "Arts organizations such as Precita Eyes continue to support Chicano muralism's original objective: to create public art that authentically represents a community's history and culture."

== Programs ==
A Precita Eyes' mural on a garage door and fence in Balmy Alley

Precita Eyes Muralists is one of only a handful of mural arts organizations in the United States. It maintains two centers. The original Mural Arts Center across from Precita Park at 348 Precita Avenue is used primarily by the education program for toddler, kids and youth classes. The Precita Eyes Mural Arts and Visitors Center, at 2981 24th Street, conducts mural tours; has a small art supply and mural merchandise store; is used as a gallery space and a space for workshops for adults to plan and design mural art; has space to work on mosaics and portable murals; and contains Precita Eyes Muralists’ Offices.

Precita Eyes Muralists offers weekly art classes for toddlers, children and youth 18 months to 19 years old.

Precita Eyes offers walking tours that cover mural history and the cultural and historical significance of the murals in Balmy Alley and the wider Mission district. Tours are open to the public during the weekends. Private tours for large groups such as school classes or visiting groups can be scheduled during the weekday and are tailored to the audience.

== See also ==
- Calle 24 Latino Cultural District

== Bibliography ==
- Community Murals as Democratic Art and Education by David Conrad, Journal of Aesthetic Education, Vol. 29, No. 1 (Spring, 1995), pp. 98–102, University of Illinois Press
- Coming Up Taller: Arts And Humanities Programs For Children And Youth At, by Judith Humphreys Weitz, 1996, Diane Publishing
