= Miranda Bergman =

American muralist (born 1947)

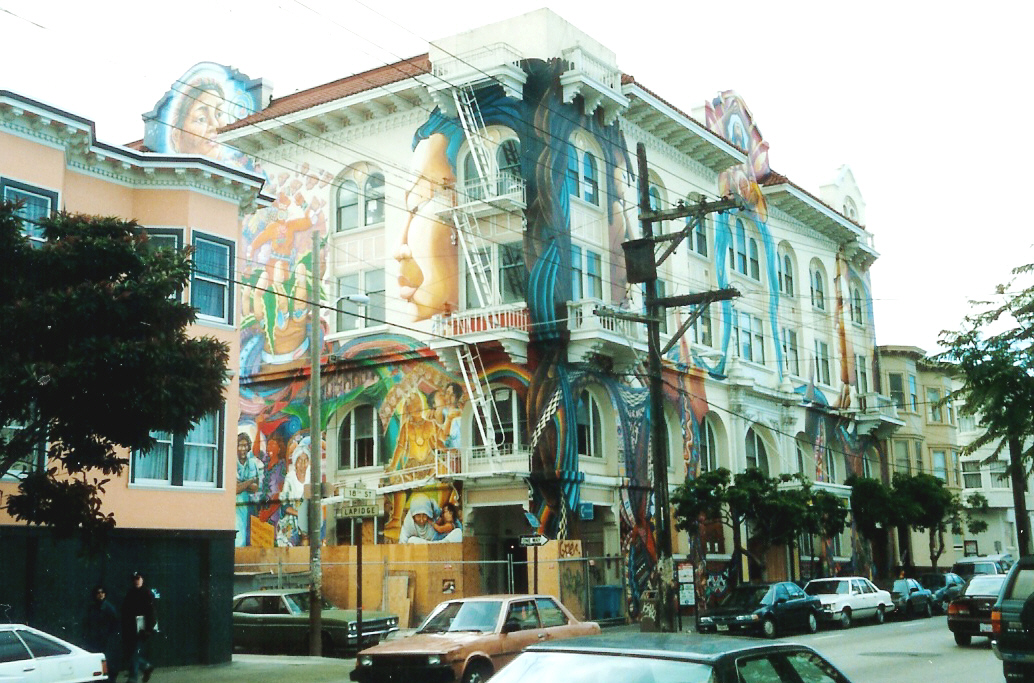
San Francisco Women's Building

Miranda Bergman is an American contemporary muralist born in 1947. She grew up in the San Francisco Mission District, where she attended Balboa High School. Bergman is known for being one of the seven female artists who, in 1994, created the MaestraPeace mural. This artwork is the largest mural in San Francisco, and covers The Women's Building. Most of the murals created/co-created by Bergman straddle artistry and social activism. She now lives in Oakland.

== Early life ==
Bergman's parents, Leibel and Anne Bergman, were left-wing activists.

== Work ==
In the 1970s, she joined other artists such as Jane Norling and Peggy Tucker in the Haight-Ashbury Muralists; this was a group formed during protests against the Vietnam War. From 1972 to 1976, Bergman created labor-themed posters with Norling for the Working Peoples' Artists collective. In 1978, She worked on a CETA-funded project with young women in the city's Juvenile Hall to paint murals inside their own cell doors, as well as other parts of the jail.

In 1986, Bergman worked with Juana Alicia, Hector Noel Méndez, Ariella Seidenberg, and Arch Williams to create the mural El Amancer (The Dawn) in a park in Managua, Nicaragua. Bergman and Alicia completed part of the work in the middle of the night, guarded by armed teenagers and "working in spite of the threat of a U.S.-backed Contra attack."

Her South Africa-themed photo collage was included in the Syracuse Cultural Workers' 1987 calendar.

She worked and lived in the Palestinian city of Ramallah for nine weeks in 1989 with three other Jewish-American female artists and teachers as part of the Break the Silence mural project. The mural they created together is in the Popular Arts Center in Ramallah, Palestine. Bergman's poster Tribute to Palestinian Women was included in the 1989-1990 traveling exhibition In Celebration of the State of Palestine and is now part of the digital collection of The Palestine Poster Project Archives.

In 1984 she co-created "The Culture Contains the Seed of Resistance That Blossoms into the Flower of Liberation" with O’Brien Thiele, the last intact mural among the famed PLACA murals of Balmy Alley in San Francisco. This mural depicts a naturally beautiful landscape contrasted against women holding photographs of desaparecidos. Bergman has worked on other murals during her time with the PLACA in the San Francisco Bay Area. In the 1990s, Bergman was also a consulting editor of Frontiers: A Journal of Women Studies.

Bergman participated in the May, 2017 San Francisco SOMArts Cultural Center's exhibition, "Shifting Movements: Art Inspired by the Life and Activism of Yuri Kochiyama (1921-2014)."

== Publications ==
- Community Murals An International Visual Arts Magazine, Volume 12, No. 1 (Spring 1987)
- Maestrapeace Art Works (2000)
