= Ester Hernandez =

American artist (born 1944)

- Born: 1944 (age 81–82); Dinuba, San Joaquin Valley, California, U.S.
- Education: University of California, Berkeley
- Movement: Bay Area Chicano Art Movement
- Website: esterhernandez.com

Ester Hernández (born 1944) is an American Chicana visual artist recognized for her prints and pastels focusing on farm worker rights, cultural, political, and Chicana feminist issues. Hernández was an activist in the Chicano Arts Movement in the 1960's and also made art pieces that focus on issues of social justice, civil rights, women's rights, and the Farm Worker Movement. She is based in San Francisco, California.

== Early life and education ==
Hernández is a Chicana of Yaqui and Mexican heritage. During the Great Depression, Hernandez’s grandparents immigrated from Mexico to California to work on commercial grape farms. She was born in Dinuba, a small town in the central San Joaquin Valley of California. Her parents and family were farmworkers. Hernandez’s father Simón Hernández was a member of the United Farm Workers Union. Hernandez had an interest in art from an early age, particularly in paintings and pastels. During her time in Dinuba, Hernandez watched as friends and family were diagnosed with cancer as a result of the usage of pesticides in the grape fields. Hernandez described having memories of watching her mother boil water to ensure that it was safe to drink due to pesticide contamination. These experiences influenced her to create the screen print “Sun Mad.” Hernandez’s parents had to give up on their education early on, causing them to push for Hernandez to continue her own education and graduate high school. Once she graduated high school, Hernandez moved to San Francisco, got married and had a son.

In 1976, Hernández earned a Bachelor of Art degree at the University of California, Berkeley. Although Hernandez had originally began studying anthropology, she became interested in print-making during her time attending Berkeley. During this time, Hernandez worked with many emerging Chicano artists and eventually joined the Mujeres Muralistas.

== Career ==
Hernández's work has been exhibited both nationally and internationally since 1973. She has received awards and commissions from organizations ranging from the California Arts Council to the National Endowment for the Arts. Hernandez's work is in the permanent collections of nearly twenty national and international museums including the Los Angeles County Museum of Art in California, the Smithsonian American Art Museum in Washington, DC and the National Museum of Mexican Art.

Hernández's archives are housed at the Stanford University Library's Department of Special Collections in Palo Alto, California.

Hernández often draws inspiration from her personal heroines, who include Frida Kahlo, Dolores Huerta, and Lydia Mendoza.

In 2024, her work was included in Xican-a.o.x. Body, a scholarly group presentation at the Pérez Art Museum Miami, Florida, spanning works from the 1960s to the present. The show has an accompanying catalog published by Chicago University Press.

== Notable Artworks ==
=== La Virgen de Guadalupe Defendiendo los Derechos de Los Xicanos (1976) ===
La Virgen de Guadalupe Defendiendo los Derechos de Los Xicanos is an etching and aquatint created by Hernandez in 1976 while she was a student at UC Berkeley. This print is in the permanent collection at the Smithsonian Museum of Art. It is considered to be the first art to reimagine Our Lady of Guadalupe in a Chicana feminist context.

In the etching, Our Lady of Guadalupe is pictured with the iconic halo, cerulean mantel, and the angel carrying a moon. However, in Hernandez's etching, Our Lady of Guadalupe is visually reimagined by sporting a karate uniform and delivering a powerful kick. In addition to this, the angel's facial expression is changed.

While enrolled in an etching class at UC Berkeley, Ester Hernandez was inspired by personal experiences that ultimately led her to create La Virgen de Guadalupe Defendiendo los Derechos de los Xicanos. In an interview with scholar Roman-Odio, who has written extensively on Chicana feminist art, Ester Hernandez shared she received a card with the image of Our Lady of Guadalupe at her grandmother's funeral but immediately thought that it did not truly represent her grandmother: “My grandmother had sixteen kids, worked years in the fields and had a hard, but beautiful life. She was a strong and powerful woman, so I decided to change the image.” Additionally, at the same time she was enrolled in the etching class, she was also taking a women's self-defense class with other Chicana women.

=== Libertad (1976) ===
Libertad is a 1976 etching that Hernandez created in response to the American Bicentennial celebration while she was a student at UC Berkeley. The piece depicts a female artist, identified by many as a Chicana artist, chipping away at the Statue of Liberty and revealing a Mayan Sculpture. In Libertad, Hernandez reimagines the Statue of Liberty, an iconic American symbol, to reclaim the history of the Americas and uplift the presence of natives peoples.

=== Sun Mad (1982) ===
Sun Mad (ofrenda dedicated to the artist's father, a farm worker from the San Joaquin Valley, CA) (1989) at the National Museum of Mexican Art in 2023

Sun Mad is a 1982 serigraph. In this serigraph, the artist turns the widely recognized red-bonneted female figure carrying a basket of grapes on the Sun-Maid raisin box into a skeleton to visually protest insecticides. This screen print is in the permanent collection of the Los Angeles Museum of Art in California, the Smithsonian American Art Museum in Washington, DC and the National Museum of Mexican Art in Chicago.

Describing this image, Hernandez states, "Slowly I began to realize how to transform the Sun Maid and unmask the truth behind the wholesome figures of agribusiness. Sun Mad evolved out of my anger and my fear of what would happen to my family, my community, and to myself."

This image is featured in a 1989 installation titled Sun Mad that is dedicated to the artist's father who was a farm worker from the San Joaquin Valley, California. This installation is in the permanent collection of the National Mexican Museum of Art in Chicago.

=== Tejido de los Desaparecidos / Weaving of the Disappeared (1984) ===
Tejido de los Desaparecidos is a silkscreen print created by Hernandez in 1984. This piece is a commentary on the Guatemalan civil war that led to the genocide of Maya people. The silkscreen print replicates the pattern and textures of a traditional Guatemalan rebozo (shawl) but also includes small white images of helicopters, skeletons, and red blood splatters.

=== La Ofrenda (1990) ===
La Ofrenda is a 1990 serigraph. This print is in the permanent collection at the Smithsonian American Art Museum in Washington, DC and the National Museum of Mexican Art in Chicago.

This print portrays a woman with a short punk-style haircut facing away from spectators while showcasing La Virgen de Guadalupe tattooed on her back. La Virgen de Guadalupe is a symbol representing womanhood and femininity throughout Chicanx history. By depicting this tattoo on a woman, Vincent Carillo argues that Hernández "questions the gendered power dynamics" that restrict women to the domestic sphere.

=== La Virgen De Las Calles (2001) ===
In 2001, Hernández created La Virgen de las Calles (Virgin of the Streets), a pastel print, to represent the hard working Latina women in a glorified and divine perspective. The subject of the print is a woman wearing a red sweatshirt with the letters “USA”, jeans, black Nike tennis shoes and a green and red striped shawl with stars. The shawl closely resembles the mantel in the image of Our Lady of Guadalupe. In front of the women, there is a bucket full of roses with the word “future”. The roses depicted here also reinforce the reimagination of Our Lady of Guadalupe as it references the story of her apparition to Juan Diego.

La Virgen de las Calles was special to Hernández because it was important for her to depict the love a Chicana mother has for her family, and how many Chicana mothers just like the one in this piece “‘…[often] work day and night to educate their children because they know this is the greatest gift a parent can give a child.’"

=== BudaLupe (2007) ===
BudaLupe is a mixed media acrylic painting with Japanese paper college that depicts both the image of the Budha and image of Our Lady of Guadalupe. The print draws inspiration from Japanese cultural practices such as Shintoism and Buddhism, as well as art practices such as papermaking and pottery. The cross-cultural nature of BudaLupe is representative of the artist's own family as well as a reflection of the idea that cultural diversity brings a richness to life.

=== Sun Raid (2008) ===
Sun Raid is a 2008 screen print on paper. This screen print is the permanent collection at the Smithsonian American Art Museum. Hernandez reimagines the classic Sun Mad to condemn the high amounts of workplace raids and the creation of Immigration and Customs Enforcement (ICE) during the administration of George W. Bush on the grounds of “national security”. Sun Raid references this national security strategy as a consequence of globalization, stating it as a “by-product of NAFTA”, the North American Free Trade Agreement that went into effect in 1994. Using visual signifiers such as huipil clothing the skeletal figure, and a wrist monitor that says “ICE”, Hernandez connects the effects of globalization to the forced economic and physical displacement of various indigenous communities that made up a portion of undocumented immigrants largely affected by these national security strategies.

=== Wanted (2010) ===
Wanted is a screenprint created by Hernández in 2010 as a response to the anti-immigration policies like SB 1070 that allowed for racial profiling in Arizona. The screenprint mimics police wanted posters and portrays Our Lady of Guadalupe as a wanted terrorist by the office of the "President of Arizona". The work depicts a wanted poster with La Virgen de Guadalupe wanted for terrorism by Arizona authorities. Included is a description, aliases and the frontal and side profile of an ordinary looking woman who represents La Virgen. The artist said of the Wanted: “La Virgen de Guadalupe represents the resilient spirit of our people, and that can never be captured or taken away.” La Virgen de Guadalupe is the patroness saint of Mexico and is strongly associated with the Mexican national identity.

=== CUANDO BAILA YEMAYA (2014) ===
CUANDO BAILA YEMAYA is a Giclee print created by Hernández in 2014. The print depicts an interpretation of the goddess Yemọja also known as Yemaya, including her symbols or items associated with her: cowrie shells, fans and watermelon. The goddess, Yoruba in origin, is representative of many different cultures, and is often associated with or linked to worship of The Virgin Mary (or La Virgen de Guadalupe) in Latin American practices.

== Solo exhibitions ==
- The Defiant Eye, Galeria de La Raza, San Francisco (1988)
- Sun Mad Installation, Mexican Museum, San Francisco (1993)
- The Art of Provocation: Ester Hernandez - A Retrospect, Gorman Gallery, University of California, Davis (1995)
- Day of the Dead, CreArte Gallery, Minneapolis (1996)
- Ester Hernandez - Everyday Passions, Galeria de la Raza, San Francisco (2001)
- Inspiraciones, Patricia Correia Gallery, Santa Monica (2005)

== Awards ==
- Sor Juana Award | National Museum of Mexican Art (2016)
- Corazon del Barrio, Award of Excellence | Mission Cultural Center for Latino Arts (2012)
- Lifetime Achievement Award | Women's Caucus for Art (2009)
- Artist Activist Award | California Rural Legal Assistance (2007)
- Hellen Crocker Russell Award | San Francisco Foundation Community Leadership Awards (2004)
- Premio Galeria | Galeria de la Raza (2004)
