= Susan Cervantes =

American artist

Susan Kelk Cervantes
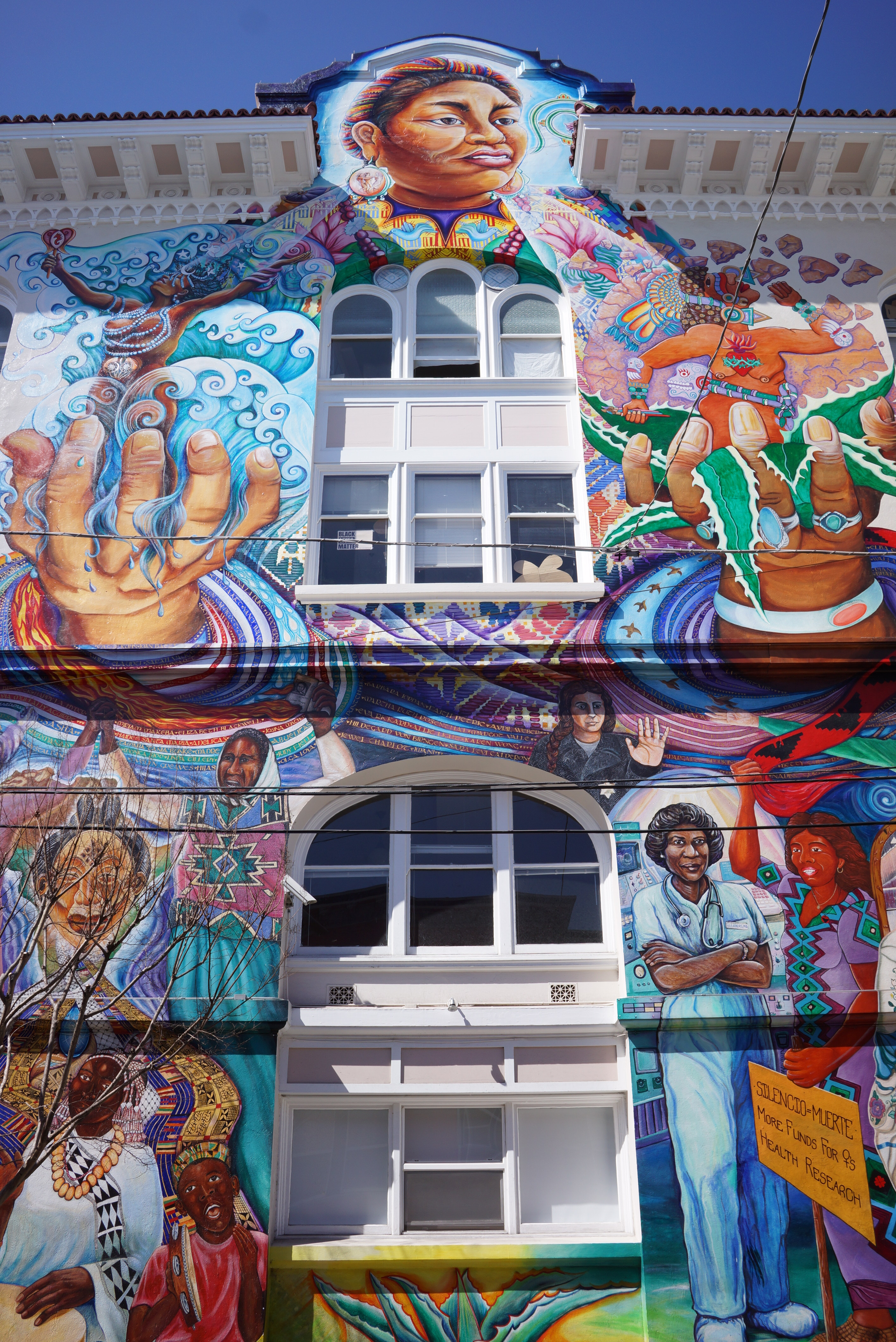
- Mural on The Women's Building
- Born: Susan Elizabeth Kelk; 1944 (age 81–82); Dallas, Texas, U.S.
- Other names: Susan Kelk-Cervantes, Susan Cervantes
- Education: San Francisco Art Institute
- Known for: Muralism
- Spouse: Luis Cervantes (m. ?—2005; death)
- Children: 3

Susan Kelk Cervantes (née Susan Elizabeth Kelk; born 1944) is an American artist. She is a leading member of the San Francisco mural movement and the co-founder and executive director of the community-based non-profit, Precita Eyes Muralists.

== Personal life and education ==
Susan Elizabeth Kelk graduated high school a year early in Dallas, Texas to attend art school at the age of 16. Since her parents could not help pay her tuition after losing their floral and nursery business Kelk accepted a scholarship from the Dallas Museum of Art and attended the San Francisco School of Fine Arts, (now known as the San Francisco Art Institute or SFAI). Kelk received her Bachelor of Fine Arts in 1965 and Master of Fine Arts in 1968 from SFAI.

In her first year of college in the 1960s, Kelk met her husband and collaborator, Luis Cervantes (1924–2005). They had three sons together.

== Career ==
Susan Cervantes is considered a leader in the Mission District community mural movement and considers herself a community artist responsible for over 400 murals. Cervantes was introduced to murals through Diego Rivera's The Making of a Fresco Showing the Building of a City (1931) at Diego Rivera Gallery and was inspired by and then joined the Mujeres Muralistas in the early 1970s. She was asked to help paint with the Mujeres Muralistas at Paco's Tacos, a restaurant on the corner of 24th and South Van Ness, which marks the moment she lost interest in her studio work on canvas. Though Cervantes was not Chicana her work was strongly influenced by and sensitive to the Chicano art movement.

Later, Susan began volunteering as an art teacher at the Precita Valley Community Center where her Thursday night painting workshop quickly became a mural workshop. The class did not have a wall to teach on, so they painted on five plywood panels, totaling 20 feet when assembled. That mural, named Masks of God, Soul of Man was the first and only mural Susan created that didn't have a wall waiting for it, meaning that "Walls come to [her]" and that her work is all currently by request. It was displayed in the Bernal Heights Library and was debuted as the work of the Precita Eyes Muralists. Susan and Luis founded the Precita Eyes Mural Arts Center in 1977. Precita Eyes has been recognized for creating public art that reflects its community's history and culture. One of only three community mural centers in the United States, Precita Eyes sponsors and implements ongoing mural projects throughout the Bay Area and internationally. Some of her notable work has appeared at the MaestraPeace mural on the Women's Building, Clarion Alley Mural Project, Chicano Art: Resistance and Affirmation, Balmy Alley and on the Northeastern University Latinx Student Cultural Center.

Maestrapiece is a monumental mural, created by Susan Cervantes and six other artists with the help of over one hundred volunteers, that depicts vibrant and powerful images of women from various cultures and historical periods, highlighting their strength, resilience, and contributions to society. Located on the Women’s Building in San Francisco, California, the mural serves as a hub for various organizations and programs that promote women's rights, social justice, and cultural diversity. For her part, Cervantes drew inspiration from artists with various backgrounds such as Diego Rivera, Dewey Crumpler, and the Las Mujeres Muralistas. One of Susan Cervantes’ significant contributions to the mural consisted of developing Menchú’s huipil, connecting the idea of textile manufacturing that is evident throughout the mural, even though the seven participating artists never claimed any of the motifs as their own. The mural’s use of textiles includes Zapotec fabrics, Chinese needlework, and North American quilts, all which constitute a popular form of artistic expression for women all around the world. Overall, Cervantes and the other artists contribution led to a beautiful two-walled mural that represents themes of feminism, social activism, and the achievements of women throughout history.

Precita Eyes has participated in many of the murals that are in San Francisco's historic Mission District neighborhood, known for the murals that cover the walls of many buildings in the neighborhood. They collaborate with schools in the community, as well as other youth programs, to allow youth artists to plan and execute their own mural design at their school or local building. Precita Eyes partners with mural artists to teach technique and creative thinking to the students that they work with, making sure that they have guidance but the freedom to create a mural that is meaningful to them and their community. Also among their slew of programs is a toddler art class, support for young student artists through exhibitions of their work, and providing educational tours of the murals in the neighborhood.

== International Collaborations and Work ==
Susan Cervantes took her community mural practice international through collaborative public art projects in Russia and China. In the 1990s and 2000s Susana Cervantes participated in the creation of Water is Life in Leningrad, Soviet Union. This mural is described as one of the first community murals painted in the Soviet Union. She later directed mural collaborations with local artists, students and community organizations in Moscow, St. Petersburg, and Beijing. These projects include All People, One Heart (1997) at the Moscow National Jewish School, Garden of Friendship (2003) in St. Petersburg and Children Connecting the Work With Knowledge and Understanding (2009) at the China National Children’s Center in Beijing.These international mural projects demonstrate cultural exchange and collaborative public art practices.

=== Cleveland Elementary School ===
In 1993, Susana painted Keep Our Ancient Roots Alive with guest Russian muralists; Sascha Fomina and Nicola Bogomolov. This mural is located on Cleveland Elementary School in San Francisco. This collaboration mural with international artists shows students walking on a rainbow that leads them towards an ancient tree, accompanied by the school’s heroes such as Martin Luther King, Jr. and Cesar Chavez, T.L.C..

=== Moscow Jewish School ===
In 1997, Cervantes directed the All people, One Heart, a series of four community murals at the Moscow National Jewish School in Moscow, Russia. The project was created in collaboration with more than twenty Russian artists, children, teachers, and neighbors. Artslink, an international arts exchange organization, funded this community based mural. According to contemporary reporting, a Russian artist invited Susan Cervantes to lead the project due to her experience in directing collaborative murals through Precita Eyes Muralists. The murals were designed as a collective art project involving the wider school community and reflected Cervantes’ emphasis on accessible public art.

=== All For One Earth ===
In the summer of 1990, Cervantes painted Water is Life as part of the project All for One Earth. The mural is painted on a firewall located in the Gavansky Workers’ Town complex, Russia . The project took 2 weeks to complete because of the large scale. It was created using acrylic paint brought from the United States. Vasilestrovsky residents ultimately advocated for the mural to be conserved because they resonated with its message. The project shows the collaboration of American and Soviet Union artists during that time.
