= Juana Alicia =

American artist (born 1953)

- Born: Juana Alicia Araiza; 1953 (age 72–73); Newark, Essex County, New Jersey, US
- Education: University of California, Santa Cruz (BA), San Francisco Art Institute (MFA)
- Occupations: Artist, educator, activist
- Known for: Muralist, painter, printmaker
- Notable work: Las Lechugeras (1983)
- Movement: Chicana art
- Website: www.juanaalicia.com

Juana Alicia (born 1953) is an American muralist, printmaker, educator, activist and, painter. She has been an educator for forty years. Alicia, as part of the faculty Berkeley City College, founded and directed the True Colors Public Art program. Her sculptures and murals are principally located in the San Francisco Bay Area, Nicaragua, Mexico, Pennsylvania, and in many parts of California.

== Biography ==
=== Early life and education ===
Juana Alicia was born in Newark, New Jersey in 1953. She grew up in an African American community near the Detroit Institute of Art (DIA) in Detroit, Michigan.

Alicia attended the University of California Santa Cruz earning her Bachelor of Arts (BA) in Teaching Aesthetic Awareness from a Cultural Perspective, with a Bilingual Cross-Cultural Emphasis Credential in 1979. Alicia also received a Single Subjects Credential in Art Education in 1980. Three years later, in 1983, Alicia earned her Fifth Year Certificate in Bilingual Education, and received a Master of Fine Arts (M.F.A.) degree in drawing and painting from San Francisco Art Institute (SFAI) in May 1990.

=== Teaching and jobs ===
In 1972, Alicia was recruited by labor organizer Cesar Chavez on one of his national speaking tours, to work for the United Farmworkers Union as an artist. She moved to Salinas, California during the peak of the United Farm Worker Movement. Instead of doing direct cultural work, Alicia went to work in the agricultural fields as a field organizer. During the strikes in Salinas in 1973 and 1976, she worked for FreshPict, a strawberry grower. She also worked for Interharvest, a United Fruit-owned lettuce company. She worked up until September 1976 in the fields but then stopped because at the time she was seven months pregnant with her son and was exposed to pesticide poisoning. The poisoning led to chronic pneumonia which she suffered for several years.

After working in the fields, Alicia worked as a paraprofessional in a bilingual classroom next to the hiring hall for the United Farm Workers. Her son was born in December 1976 and she never went back to work in the fields. In 1981, she moved to the Mission District of San Francisco and began to exhibit her art, all while working outside of the arts to make ends meet. Alicia has taught at Stanford University, University of California Santa Cruz, University of California Davis, San Francisco State University, and Berkeley City College. Dedicated to the development of young artists, she co-founded and co-directed the San Francisco Early Childhood School for the Creative Arts and the East Bay Center for Urban Arts. Through her teaching jobs, Alicia has fostered several generations of young muralists and activist artists.

== Art and chronology ==
Alicia's painting style is colorful, complex and dynamic. Through her art, she attempts to convey a sense of shared humanity and appreciation for the environment. Alicia paints in a style that blends realism, abstraction and surrealism together, as needed depending on her subject matter.

=== Notable murals ===
==== Las Lechugeras (1983) ====
Alicia's first big mural project in San Francisco was Las Lechugeras (The Women Lettuce Workers). It is located on the corner of York and 24th Street in Mission District, San Francisco. The mural is thirty by fifty feet and was begun in 1982. The building the mural is painted on is a Mexican meat market and the owner specified that they wanted a mural that had something to do with food. Alicia came up with a design and immediately she faced criticism that seemed insensitive and racist, but she stood by her work and the design was approved and became the final mural. The mural's main focus is on six women harvesting lettuce heads. One of the women is pregnant (and her uterus is transparent, allowing the viewer to see the fetus) and the others are picking lettuce, wrapping it in plastic or looking out at the field. An airplane sprays pesticides overhead while white men driving in a car pass by. The mural is in a public area and is meant to be community art. This mural depicted female workers and their struggles against working conditions and pesticide poisoning in California. Her experience as a female farm worker as well as an organizer for the United Farm Workers helped shape the mural's content, and so the mural itself is autobiographical. In addition, Alicia intended the mural to be for the largely Latino neighborhood where she painted it. She also wanted viewers, especially American viewers, to think about where their food comes from and who is involved in its production. Las Lechugeras is also significant because of its feminist message in its depiction of strong women at work. It also has a strong environmental and human rights message signified by the crop duster which sprays the workers with no regard to health.

Over time, the mural has degraded from weathering. Alicia has tried several times to raise money to restore the mural, although she would prefer to do a permanent mosaic based on the mural in its place.

After it went up, the artist was given a 90-day warning that the mural would be destroyed because of water damage. Coincidentally, this opened way for her project that was much related to Las Lechugeras.

==== Alto al Fuego/Cease Fire (1988) ====
Alicia's Alto al Fuego is a mural which deals with the subject of violence. The main figure, a young man with a mountain behind him, has several rifles aimed at his chest by unknown aggressors. Two large hands are placed between the rifles and the man. The boy is smiling as he confronts the violence. The mural, while dealing with violence also provides a sense of hope that the violence will be prevented.

==== La Llorona Project, San Francisco ====
La Llorona (The Weeping Woman), replaced Las Lechugeras. This mural depicts environmental struggles involving women around the world. The mural takes its title from the widespread Mexican myth of a woman who allegedly drowned her children and spends the rest of her life weeping for them. La Llorona mural illustrates stories of women in Bolivia, India, and the Mexico–United States border together. It helps highlight Bolivians in Cochabamba who have advocated to keep Bechtel Corporation from buying the water rights in their country. Indian farm workers in the Narmada Valley who advocate against government's irresponsible dam projects that damage their homes. Finally, the women in black protesting the unsolved murders of women in the city of Juarez, in the Rio Grande and the maquiladora (sweatshops).

She created her in the spring of 2004 at the corners of York and 24th Streets. With sponsorship by The San Francisco Women's Center and the Galeria de la Raza, the support of Las Trenzas Latina Student and Alumnae Organization of UC Berkeley, and funding from The Potrero Nuevo Fund, The San Francisco Mayor's Neighborhood Beautification Fund, the Greppi and Leone family and private donors, the artist was able to complete this mural project.

==== True Colors Mural Project ====
Alicia is the founder and director of the True Colors Mural Project. True Colors is a public mural program at Berkeley City College. Through her Mural Design and Creation course at BCC, and also in collaboration with the City of Berkeley's Youth Works Program, Earth Island Institute and other community-based organizations. True Colors helps create one or more public murals each year. This project aims to support the development of young artists and activists for the improvement of the urban environment through a creation and collaboration of public murals. The purpose of the murals is to both educate urban residents. Also, beautify the urban environment with positive messages and images that advocate for ecological sustainability, conservation and restoration. The project recruits, engages and employs under-served, at risk youth from Berkeley and the greater East Bay, in vital community environmental mural arts projects. True Colors trains young artists to design and create community murals with social and environmental justice themes.

==== The ESAY/Fulbright Project ====
Alicia works and has worked in Mérida, Yucatán, México at the Escuela Superior de Arte de Yucatán (ESAY) where she taught workshops in Chicano Mural History, Design and Technique. The workshops will finish in a mural at the university's new location, in the neo-Mayan art deco train station. Which is an architectural landmark in downtown Mérida. ESAY is a multidisciplinary arts university, featuring visual arts, music, theater, dance and film/multimedia.

==== The Spiral Voice: Codex Estánfor at Stanford ====
In 2007, Stanford's Centro Chicano wrote to Alicia, offering a new commission for the Centro. Since a mural that she had created with the Yo Puedo Program during the mid-eighties had been destroyed during a renovation. The Centro requested that she create a new work of art in its place. After touring the site, Alicia drew up several proposals for the exterior and interior walls. She proposed an exterior mural that resembled her work she had recently created for the University of California, San Francisco (UCSF) Medical Center in San Francisco and in Mexico at the Universidad Tecnológica Metropolitana (UTM). She began the process by creating new murals for the Centro Chicano. The theme of the murals depicted the legacy of Latin American and Indigenous literature. The working title for the piece is Ojas de nuestro legado/Pages from Our Legacies, a play on the words pages of a book and the ojas or pencas del nopal.

==== Nopal de la Misión (2026) ====
For the 2026 reopening of the Mission Branch Library, Alicia created Nopal de la Misión, a fused-glass window of a prickly pear cactus at the top of the library's restored main staircase. She described the cactus as a symbol of resistance and regeneration.

=== San Francisco State Rebound Project Collaboration ===
in 2018, in collaboration with the San Francisco Rebound Project as well as Alicia's BCC's True Mural Colors Project created a mural at SF State's campus. The name of the mural was Incarceration to Liberation / De la Encarcelación a la Liberación. The artwork focuses on the experience of life inside the prison industrial system and paints a positive image of life after being behind bars. As sponsored by SFSU's Rebound Project, a specific department at SF State that offers special admission to ex-convicts, the mural speaks to this particular community as well as the wider university student body and faculty. Ultimately, the mural placed on the San Francisco State University campus will be used to raise awareness of this organization and garner support for it. As stated by the SFSU website, "Project Rebound is a special admissions program assisting formerly incarcerated individuals who might not normally qualify for university acceptance because of application deadlines and minor academic deficiencies."

== Awards ==
- 1982 – National Endowment for the Humanities, BIRTH MURAL Best Visual Art Work with a Chicano/Mexicano Theme, through the University of California, Santa Cruz
- 1992 – Precita Eyes Mural Arts Center, Master Muralist Award
- 1992 – Distinguished Visiting Professor, Oakes College, University of California, Santa Cruz
- 1993 – NACS (National Association of Chicano Studies), for Outstanding Contributions to the Arts, Academia and Our Communities
- 2000 – Woman of Fire Award, Women of Color Resource Center, Berkeley, California
- 2004 – California State Senate, Outstanding Contributions as an Oakland Arts Educator
- 2006-2007 – Fulbright Fellowship, Escuela Superior de Arte de Yucatán (ESAY), Visiting Professor in Mural Arts/Painting
- 2020 – San Francisco Arts Commission (SFAC), Golden Capricorn Award

== Quotes ==
I am committed to having an impact on the visual vocabulary of my contemporaries, to work towards peace, and to preserve the environment. I want my work to contribute to the transformation of a violent world into a humane one, reflecting values of love, mutual respect, and awe at the beauty of nature.
