= Chuy Campusano =

American visual artist (1944–1997)

- Born: Jesus Alberto Campusano; November 21, 1944; El Paso, Texas, United States
- Died: May 4, 1997 (aged 52); California, United States
- Burial place: Holy Cross Cemetery, Colma, California, United States
- Other names: Jesús Campusano–Uribe, Jess Alberto Campusano
- Occupations: Visual artist, muralist
- Movement: Bay Area Chicano Art Movement
- Spouse: Dianne Shirley Bailey (m. 1973–1982; divorce)
- Partner: Dianne DeMoss
- Children: 2

Jesus "Chuy" Campusano (1944 – 1997), was an American Chicano visual artist, and muralist. He was a well-known contributor to San Francisco's arts in the 1970s and 1980s; and was a co-founder of Galería de la Raza, a non-profit community focused gallery that featured Latino and Chicano artists and their allies.

== Early life ==
Jesus "Chuy" Campusano was born on November 21, 1944, in El Paso, Texas; to parents Blasa (or Blaza, née Uribe) and Andres Campusano from Chihuahua, Mexico.

In early life Campusano worked as a farmworker union organizer.

== Career and late life ==
In 1970, Galería de la Raza was founded by artists Campusano, Ralph Maradiaga, Rupert García, Peter Rodríguez, René Yañez, Francisco X. Camplis, Gustavo Ramos Rivera, Carlos Loarca, Manuel Villamor, Robert Gonzales, Luis Cervantes, and Rolando Castellón. It was a non-profit art gallery and artist collective that featured Latino and Chicano artists in the Mission District of San Francisco.

Campusano, Spain Rodriguez, Rubén Guzmán, and Bob Cuff painted the Horizons Unlimited murals (exterior and interior) in 1972, at 22nd and Folsom Streets, which was one of the earliest murals in the Mission District. The Horizons Unlimited murals no longer exist.

Emmy Lou Packard, a New Deal era muralist, directed Homage To Siqueiros (1974), a 90 square feet (8.4 m^{2}) mural project at Bank of America building in the Mission District, located at Mission Street at 23rd Street. Campusano served as the head mural designer on the project working under Packard, and Luis Cortázar and Michael Rios assisted.

In the late 1970s, Campusano was a director at the Pacifica Arts and Heritage Council in Pacifica, California, where he led the creation of civic-funded art murals in San Mateo County. He also worked as a mural artist consultant.

Campusano painted a 5,000 square feet (460 m^{2}) brightly colored mural on the side of the former Lilli Ann building at 2030 Harrison Street (at 17th Street) in the Mission District in 1986. The mural was painted over in July 1998 (after the artist’s death), which spurred community protests, and a lawsuit. The case was settled for USD $200,000.

His work was featured in the noted Chicano Art: Resistance and Affirmation traveling group art exhibition in 1990–1993, alongside other major Chicano artists.

Campusano died on May 4, 1997, in California. He was survived by his partner Dianne DeMoss, and his two children.

== Exhibitions ==
- 1977, Paintings, Drawings and a Mural Presentation by Jesus (Chuy) Campusano, solo exhibition, Loeb Rhoades Market Hours Gallery on the 8th floor of the Transamerica Pyramid, San Francisco, California
- 1986, Teotihuacan Fresco Mural Project, solo exhibition, Mexican Museum, San Francisco, California
- 1990–1993, Chicano Art: Resistance and Affirmation, traveling group exhibition, Wight Art Gallery at University of California, Los Angeles; San Francisco Museum of Modern Art; Fresno Art Museum; Tucson Museum of Art; Denver Art Museum; Albuquerque Museum of Art and History; National Museum of American Art, Washington, D.C. (now Smithsonian American Art Museum); Bronx Museum of the Arts; El Paso Museum of Art; and the San Antonio Museum of Art

== See also ==
- Mission Cultural Center for Latino Arts
- United Farm Workers
