= Francisco X. Camplís =

American artist

- Born: Francisco Xavier Camplís; 1934 (age 91–92)
- Other name: Francisco X. Camplis
- Education: University of San Francisco, San Francisco Art Institute, Stanford University (MA)
- Occupations: Visual artist, printmaker, photographer, filmmaker, animator
- Movement: Bay Area Chicano Art Movement
- Spouse: Lorenza Campusano de Camplis

Francisco Xavier Camplís (born 1934) is an American Chicano visual artist, printmaker, photographer, and filmmaker. In 1970, he co-founded the Galería de la Raza in San Francisco.

== Biography ==
Francisco Xavier Camplís was born in 1934, in San Francisco, California. He attended the University of San Francisco, San Francisco Art Institute, and Stanford University. He was a veteran of the Korean War.

In 1970, Galería de la Raza was founded by artists including Camplís, Chuy Campusano, Ralph Maradiaga, Peter Rodríguez, René Yañez, Rupert García, Gustavo Ramos Rivera, Carlos Loarca, Manuel Villamor, Robert Gonzales, Luis Cervantes, and Rolando Castellón. It was a non-profit art gallery and artist collective that featured Latino and Chicano artists in the Mission District of San Francisco. He also worked as an art director of Casa Hispana de Bellas Artes in San Francisco.

Camplís' work can be found in museum and public collections, including the Smithsonian American Art Museum, the Fine Arts Museums of San Francisco, San Francisco Museum of Modern Art, University of California, Santa Barbara, the César E. Chávez Branch Library Poster Collection at the Oakland Public Library, the San Francisco Arts Commission.

== Filmography ==
- 1974, Los Desarraigados (English: The Uprooted), short film
- 1976, Outlines
- 1977, La Morenita
- 2000, Unmined Treasures, short film
