= Mexican Museum (San Francisco) =

Coordinates: 37.8068°N 122.4308°W

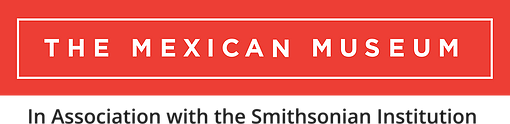

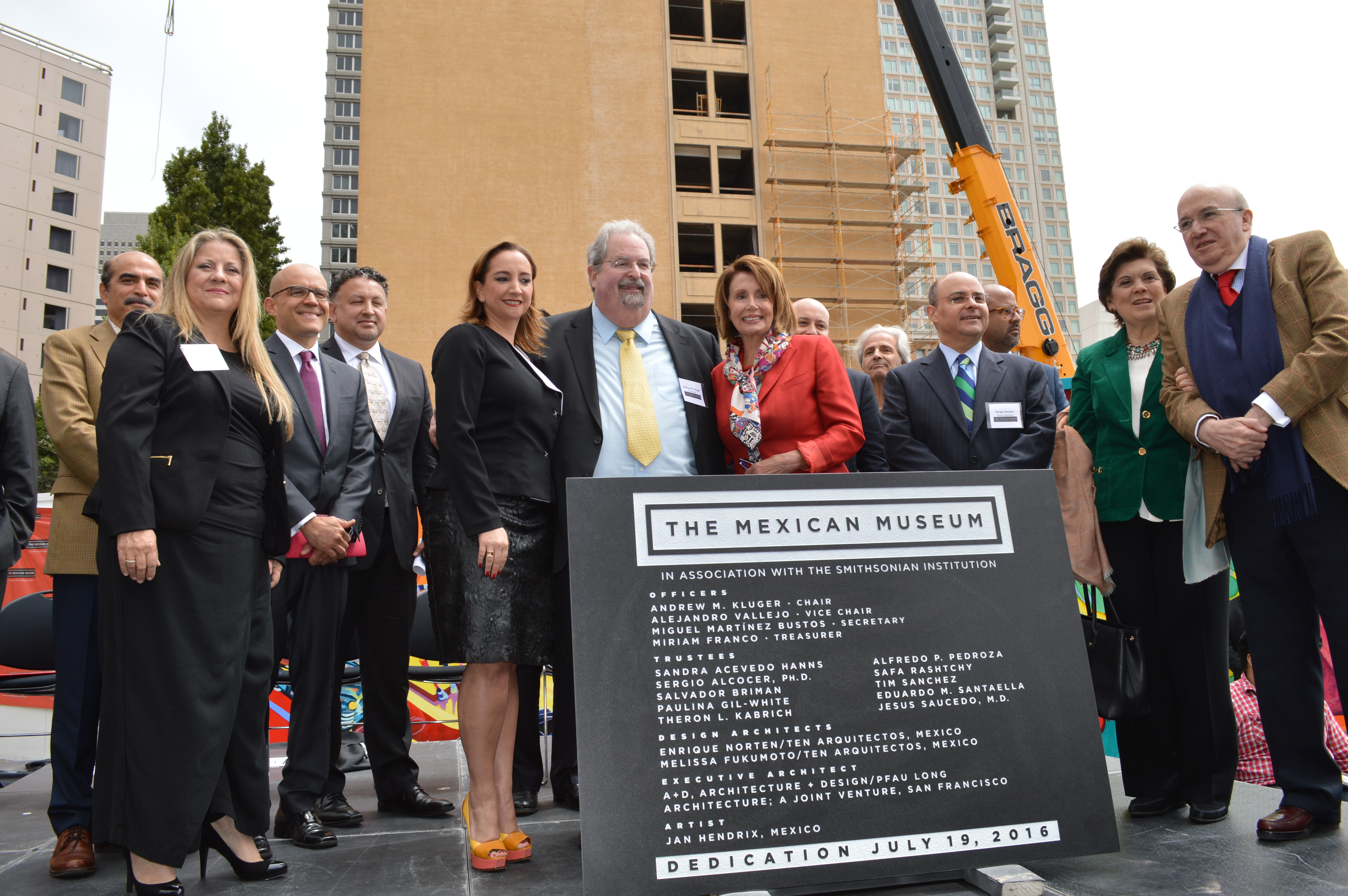
- Speaker Pelosi at the museum groundbreaking ceremony, 2016.
- Former name: El Museo Mexicano
- Established: 1975; 51 years ago
- Location: 706 Mission Street, San Francisco, California, U.S.
- Type: Art museum
- Founder: Peter Rodríguez
- Website: www.mexicanmuseum.org

The Mexican Museum (or El Museo Mexicano) is a museum created to exhibit the aesthetic expression of the Latino, Chicano, Mexican, and Mexican-American people, located in San Francisco, California, United States. As of 2022, their exhibition space was permanently closed at Fort Mason Center; and they are still in the process of moving to a new space at 706 Mission Street in Yerba Buena Gardens.

== History ==
The Mexican Museum of San Francisco was founded by San Francisco artist Peter Rodríguez in 1975. He was inspired to create this museum in order to fill a void in the public's access to Mexican and Chicano art. The museum was originally located in San Francisco's Mission District on Folsom Street in 1975.

The museum's new location was planned starting in 2015 to be built at 706 Mission Street across from Yerba Buena Gardens, as part the 53-story Yerba Buena Tower project, which will consist mostly of luxury condominiums. The entire relocation project was envisaged to cost $500 million ($30 million of which was for the museum), and was scheduled to open in 2020, however this was delayed due to the COVID-19 pandemic and a lack of funds. The city of San Francisco has granted the Mexican Museum a 66-year lease for its future use of the site, renewable for 33 years.

== About ==
The museum holds a permanent collection of over 16,000 objects including Pre-Hispanic, Colonial, Popular, Mexican and Latino Modern, and Mexican, Latino, and Chicano Contemporary art. It has one of the largest collection of Mexican, Chicano and Latino art in the United States.

== Authenticity of artifacts ==
In 2017, archaeologist Dr. Eduardo Perez De Heredi wrote a report which stated that 96% of the museum's 2,000 pre-Columbian artifacts may not be authentic and could only be classed as "decorative"; thus only 83 pieces of 2,000, or just over four percent could be certified as “museum-quality.”

Perez De Heredia, said the rest of the pieces are still being studied, and may turn out to be real or not. “This is just the process . . . We have two years to finish examining the collection,” said Dr. Perez De Heredi. He points out that U.S. museums often receive high-end forgeries as donations and the authentication process is meant to sort those out.

== See also ==
- Acción Latina
- Galería de la Raza
- Mission Cultural Center for Latino Arts
- Precita Eyes
- Self Help Graphics & Art
