= René Yañez =

Mexican-American artist, curator, and activist

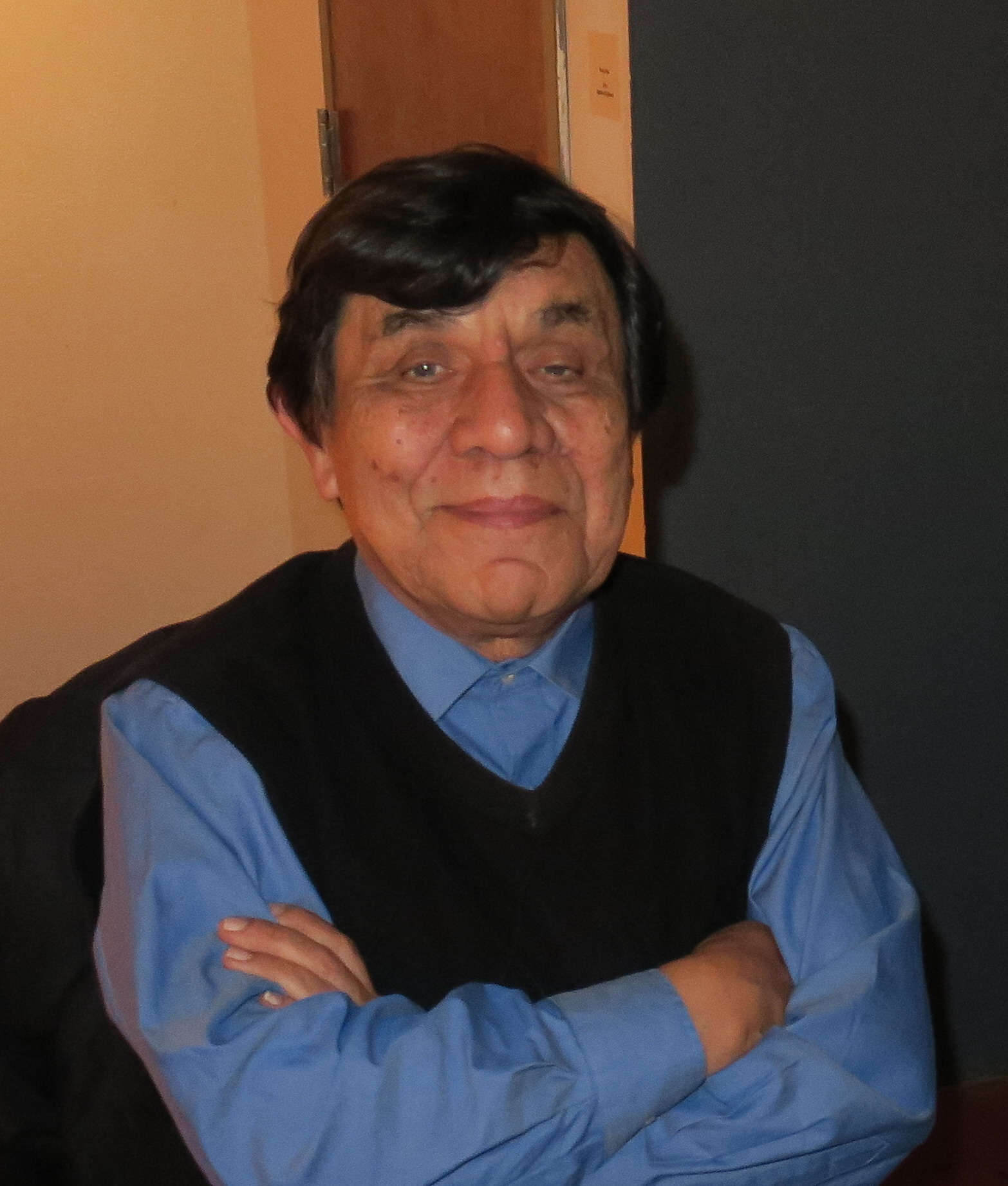
- Yañez (2016)
- Born: René Yañez-Cirlos; 19 September 1942; Tijuana, Mexico
- Died: 29 May 2018 (aged 75); San Francisco, California, U.S.
- Education: Merritt College, California College of the Arts, Golden Gate University
- Alma mater: San Francisco Art Institute
- Known for: Curation of Chicano Art, Mexican-American Pop Assemblage Art
- Movement: Bay Area Chicano Art Movement
- Children: Rio Yañez

René Yañez (19 September 1942 – 29 May 2018) was a Mexican-American painter, assemblage artist, performance artist, curator and community activist located in San Francisco, California. He was a well-known contributor to the arts of San Francisco and is a co-founder of Galería de la Raza, a non-profit community focused gallery that features Latino and Chicano artists and their allies. In the early 1970s, he was one of the first curators in the United States to introduce Mexico's Día de Muertos (Day of the Dead) as a contemporary focus and an important cultural celebration.

== Early life ==
He was born with the name René Yañez-Cirlos on 19 September 1942 in Tijuana, Mexico, and he moved to San Diego, California, with his family in 1954. Yañez became a United States citizen in 1961. He was drafted in to the Vietnam War, and when he was discharged in 1966, he moved to the San Francisco Bay Area.

Yañez went to school at Merritt College, California College of the Arts, and Golden Gate College (for arts administration). By 1970 he attended San Francisco Art Institute (SFAI) on a minority tuition waiver plan. Some other students and activists he met in the same time period included the Mujeres Muralistas members: Graciela Carrillo, Consuelo Mendez, Irene Perez, and Yolanda M. Lopez, as well as Michael V. Ríos and Jerry Concha.

Yañez married Yolanda M. Lopez in the late 1970s and they had a child, artist Rio Yañez in 1980. They divorced a few years later, but Yolanda moved into the apartment next door and they maintained a professional relationship.

== Work ==
Yañez was best known for his Mexican-American pop assemblage art with altar pieces covered in traditional Mexican objects such as beads or candles as well as American pop icons such as the Taco Bell chihuahua. Over time the altars have evolved to reflect the change in time and local community.

In 1969, he was a member of the short-lived group called the Mexican-American Liberation Art Front (MALAF). MALAF helped organize, with support from Laney College and Merritt College, three small silkscreen workshops in Oakland community development centers and these workshops were an important part of the social serigraphy movement in the San Francisco Bay Area.

In 1970, Yañez was a co-founder of Galería de la Raza in the Mission district of San Francisco, along with artists Rupert García, Peter Rodríguez, Francisco X. Camplis, Graciela Carrillo, Jerry Concha, Gustavo Ramos Rivera, Carlos Loarca, Manuel Villamor, Robert González, Luis Cervantes, Chuy Campusano, Rolando Castellón, and Ralph Maradiaga. Yañez become the Galería's first artistic director and served for over 15 years.

In 1972, Yañez brought Mexico's Day of the Dead to the Mission district with installations and followed by the art exhibitions "Room for the Dead" and "Labyrinth for the Dead" at Yerba Buena Center for the Arts.

Yañez was a member of the food-based art group The Great Tortilla Conspiracy, other members include Jos Sances, Rio Yañez, and Art Hazelwood. They are known for making tortilla art, which uses a tortilla as a canvas.

In 2001, Yañez curated the well received art exhibition Chicano Visions: American Painters on the Verge featuring 26 established Chicano artists, many of the works were from Cheech Marin's art collection which is now housed at The Cheech Marin Center for Chicano Art, Culture & Industry in Riverside, California. Chicano Visions: American Painters on the Verge toured for 5 years around the United States with 15 different exhibition locations. A book of the same title as the art exhibition was published in 2002 by Cheech Marin.

=== Eviction ===
Yañez made national news in 2013 when he and his family, including his partner of many years, artist Cynthia "Kiki" Wallis, his son Rio and his ex-wife Yolanda M. Lopez were to be evicted in June 2014 from their rental in the Mission district. They held various art exhibitions, events and community rallies related to the theme of their eviction between 2013 – 2014 including an "eviction garage sale". They had lived in the building where they were being evicted since 1978 and their monthly rent was very affordable compared to the current market value, making it difficult to find a new rental within their limited budget.

"Rene, you are my artistic godfather and needless to say, you are an icon; the artistic Capo of the Bay Area Chicano movement ... Our city has become a bohemian theme park for consumer fools with the latest gadgets in hand, but what happens when there are no more bohemians left?"

— Guillermo Gómez-Peña (2015),

== See also ==
- Chicano art movement
- Chicano Art: Resistance and Affirmation
- Tortilla art
