= Peter Rodríguez (curator) =

American artist, curator, museum director

- Born: June 25, 1926; Stockton, California, U.S.
- Died: July 1, 2016 (aged 90); San Francisco, California, U.S.
- Other names: Peter Rodriguez, Peter Rodríguez-Garcia
- Known for: painting, curation, arts administration
- Movement: Bay Area Chicano Art Movement, Abstract expressionism
- Parents: Jesús Rodríguez (father); Guadalupe García Rodríguez (mother)

Peter Rodríguez (1926 – 2016) was an American artist, curator, and museum director. He was the founder, director and curator of the Mexican Museum in San Francisco, and a co-founder of the Galería de la Raza.

== Early life ==
Peter Rodríguez was born as a twin on June 25, 1926, in Stockton, California. There were eleven children in his family, his twin brother is Tony. He was the son of Jesús Rodríguez and Guadalupe García Rodríguez, immigrants from Guadalajara, Mexico. The family lived in Fowler and Jackson, California. He attended Oneida School (or Oneida School House) in Jackson Gate, California, which is where he started making art. At a young age he took an interest in art and comics, and won awards.

When he was still young, he moved to San Francisco. Early in his career he worked in the fashion industry and in advertising. He was a self-taught artist, often using acrylics or oil paints.

== Career ==
In the early 1960s, he was invited to show his work at Museo del Estado, Jalisco in Mexico and he took time to also visit Mexico City. From 1968 to 1969, Rodríguez moved to the Tlalpan neighborhood of Mexico City, learning about culture and local arts.

By 1970, he moved to San Francisco. That same year in 1970 he co-founded the Galería de la Raza, with Chicano Movement artists Ralph Maradiaga, Rupert García, Francisco X. Camplis, Gustavo Ramos Rivera, Carlos Loarca, Manuel Villamor, Robert Gonzales, Luis Cervantes, Chuy Campusano, Rolando Castellón, and René Yañez.

in 1975, Rodríguez founded the Mexican Museum on Folsom Street in the Mission District, and served as the founding director and curator of the museum for 10 years. The museum now holds a permanent collection of over 16,000 objects. As the museum grew it needed to find a larger space, moving to Fort Mason and then to Yerba Buena Gardens, where a new space for a museum was being built and expected open in 2020 (however it's possibly delayed due to the COVID-19 pandemic).

== Death and legacy ==
He continued to paint into his 80s, even after moving into the Laguna Honda Hospital and Rehabilitation Center around 2012. Rodriguez died on July 1, 2016, at the age of 90 at the Laguna Honda Hospital in San Francisco.

On July 19, 2016, Rodríguez's legacy was celebrated in San Francisco when they unveiled the cornerstone of the new museum, with Nancy Pelosi and Claudia Ruiz Massieu in attendance.
