= Galería de la Raza =

Non-profit art gallery and art collective in San Francisco (1970–)

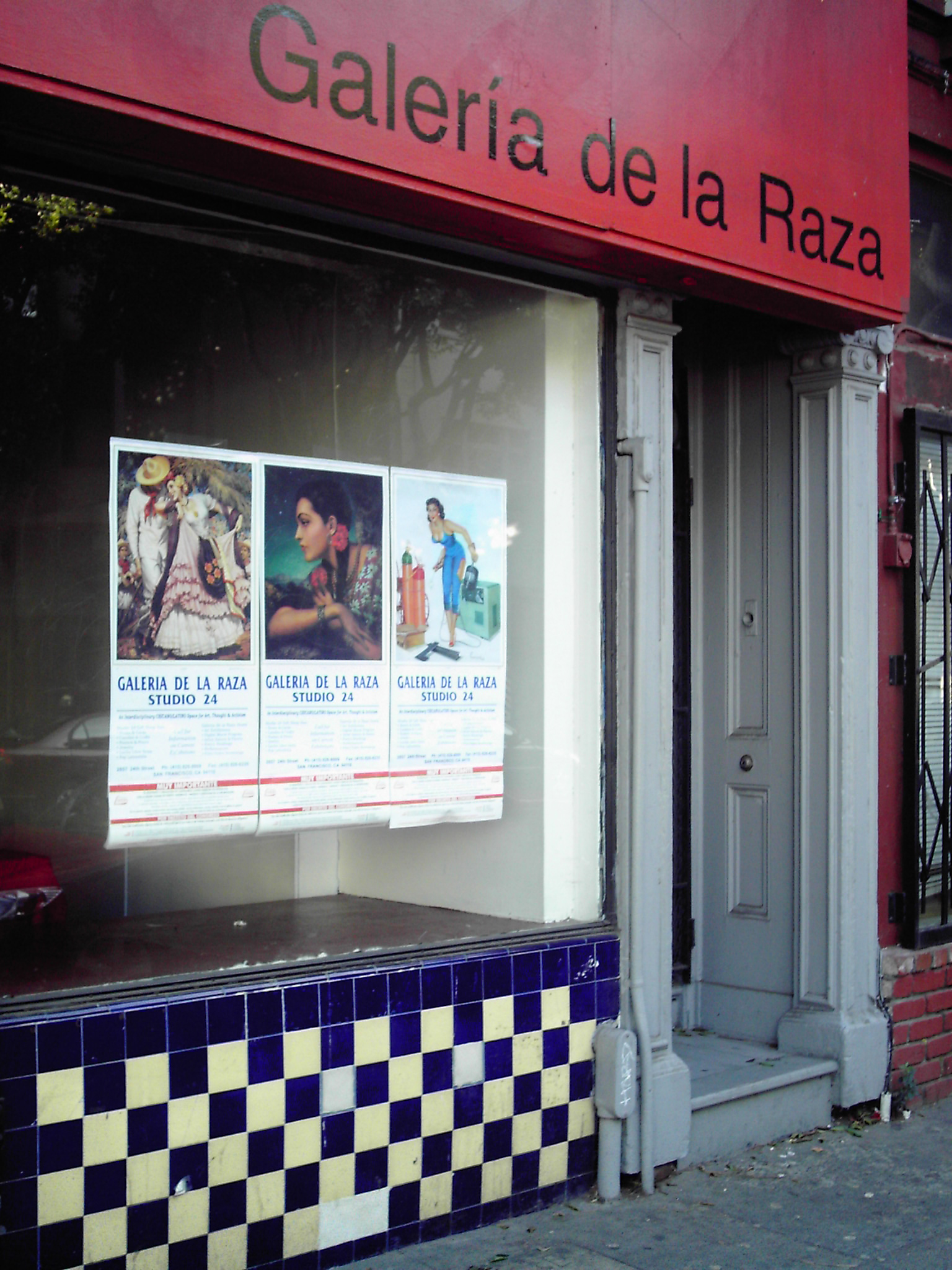
- Galería de la Raza (January 1, 2007)
- Formation: 1970
- Headquarters: 2779 Folsom Street, Calle 24, Mission District, San Francisco, California, U.S.

Galería de la Raza (GDLR) is a non-profit art gallery and artist collective founded in 1970, that serves the largely Chicano and Latino population of San Francisco's Mission District. GDLR mounts exhibitions, hosts poetry readings, workshops, and celebrations, sells works of art, and sponsors youth and artist-in-residence programs. Exhibitions at the Galería tend to feature the work of minority and developing country artists and concern issues of ethnic history, identity, and social justice.

== History ==
The Galería de la Raza was founded by Chicano Movement artists Ralph Maradiaga, Rupert García, Peter Rodríguez, Francisco X. Camplís, Gustavo Ramos Rivera, Carlos Loarca, Manuel Villamor, Robert Gonzales, Luis Cervantes, Chuy Campusano, Rolando Castellón, and René Yañez in 1970 as a place for Mexican American and other Latino artists to show their work. René Yañez become the Galería’s first artistic director and Ralph Maradiaga was the first administrative director. It developed into a community arts center that painted many murals, sponsored youth programs, and gained national and international recognition for its commitment to serving underrepresented communities.

In the mid-nineties the ReGeneration Project was started to facilitate the involvement of the next generation of artists. ReGeneration provides emerging artists with exhibition and professional development opportunities as well as opportunity to help plan and manage of Galería de la Raza activities. One of the most visible contributions of the ReGeneration Project is the updating of the temporary murals on the Bryant Street billboard. Through the new Digital Mural Project computer-generated images are created and displayed in lieu of the traditional painted murals.

The GDLR occupied a space at 2857–2858 24th Street (at Bryant Street) in the Mission District of San Francisco, from 1970 until November 2018. They vacated the space after a major change to the rent and failed negotiations with the landlord, and they have been working with the city to secure an alternative nearby space. It was moved to 2779 Folsom Street.

== Programs and exhibitions ==
Throughout its history, Galería de la Raza has given workshops in filmmaking, animation, muralism, digital art, and sponsored artists-in-residence. Important exhibitions have included "Cartelones del Cine Mexicano," which exposed Chicano artists to the styles and techniques of Mexican commercial lithographers, "The Peter Rodriguez Collection of Santos from the Mexican Museum," an exhibition of early New Mexican santos, and "Low 'n Slow," a lowrider-themed exhibit.

GDLR was also instrumental in reviving the indigenous Mexican tradition of Day of the Dead in the San Francisco Bay Area and in popularizing the work of the Mexican artists Frida Kahlo and José Guadalupe Posada among movement activists.
