= Rupert García =

Chicano artist (b. 1941)

- Born: 1941 (age 84–85); French Camp, California, U.S.
- Other name: Rupert Garcia
- Education: San Francisco State University, University of California, Berkeley
- Occupations: Visual artist, educator
- Employer: San Jose State University
- Known for: Painting, pastel art, screen printing
- Movement: Bay Area Chicano Art Movement

Rupert García (born in 1941), is an American Chicano visual artist, and educator. He is known as a painter, pastellist, and screen printer. In the 1960s, he led a Chicano movement against 'Yankee' culture through the production and use of posters and screen prints. He worked in collaboration with many Chicanx artists at different printing and art studios in the Los Angeles area, and made many activist works in support of the Chicano movement. In 1970, he co-founded the Galería de la Raza in San Francisco. He is a professor emeritus of art at San Jose State University since 2011.

== Early life and education ==
Rupert García was born in 1941 in French Camp, an agricultural town in the San Joaquin Valley. He grew up in the nearby city of Stockton, California. García was raised mostly by his mother and grandmothers, and from them learned different styles and mediums of art and creativity.

García studied painting at a junior college, and enrolled at San Francisco State College (now San Francisco State University) to study pop art. He graduated from with a BFA degree in painting in 1968. During his study in San Francisco State College, he joined the anti-war movement and participated in the 1968 student strike organized by the Third World Liberation Front. Through joining this movement, García also gained experience in printmaking, and began to incorporate it into his practice of pop and activist art. He contributed posters to the movement, and became one of the first instructors in La Raza Studies in 1969.

He received an M.A. in studio art at San Francisco State in 1970, and an M.A. degree in art history in 1981 from the University of California, Berkeley, with a thesis on Chicano murals. Garcia received an honorary Doctor of Fine Arts from the San Francisco Art Institute in 1993. Garcia won the Distinguished Artist Award for Lifetime Achievement from the College Art Association in 1992.

== Career and key works ==
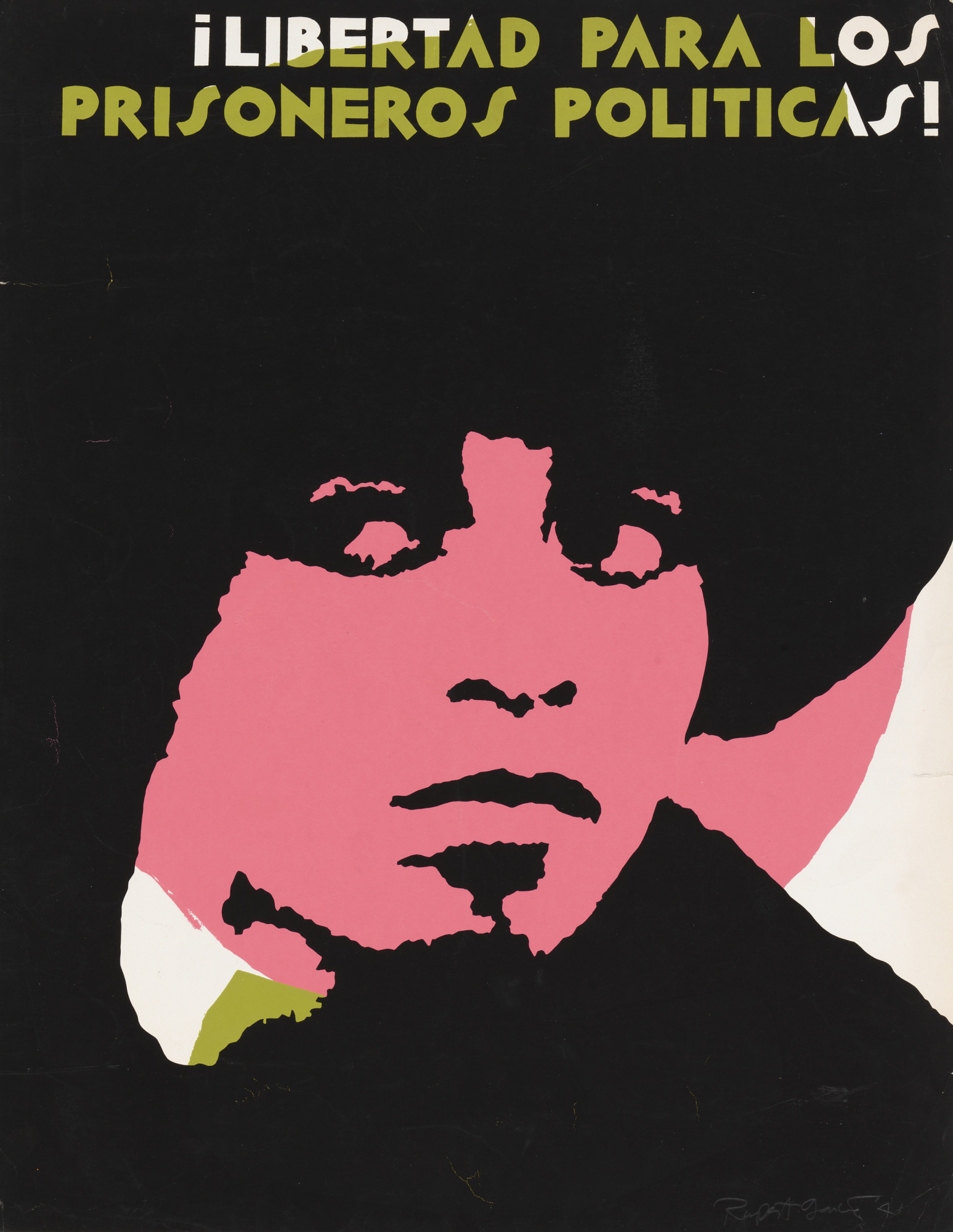
1971 poster by Rupert García urging freedom for political prisoners and depicting Angela Davis

García served in the United States Air Force during the Vietnam War, participating in Operation Rolling Thunder. During his study in San Francisco State College, he joined the anti-war movement and participated in the 1968 student strike organized by the Third World Liberation Front. García's involvement in this movement introduced him to screen printing and print making, and the prints produced were sold in order to bail out other activists that were arrested during the protests. In 1968, he decided to stop painting and made political posters condemning violence against Latinos, blacks and other minorities in the United States. He stopped painting until the mid-1970s, instead creating political posters denouncing violence against Latinos and Blacks in the United States.

Rupert García made the work ¡LIBERTAD PARA LOS PRISONEROS POLITICAS! in 1971. The work is a screen print on paper, and utilizes bright colors and big, color blocked sections. In the work, García is calling for freedom of political prisoners, as is stated in the text displayed in all caps at the top of the composition. Additionally, the work uses the likeness of Angela Davis, a major political activist at the time of the works creation. The flatness of the composition, which all of the details of Davis being printed in black, serves to draw the viewer to her eyes and expression, which stand out. Davis is looking off to the side of the composition, with a hard set expression and a strong gaze.

This work is very aligned with García's style at the time. He favored working with portraits or historical photographs, especially from a close or intimate perspective. He also would frequently use bright colors in bold overlaid shapes, in order to make the subject further stand out. García also very frequently used text in his screen prints, often English or Spanish, or sometimes a mix of the two.

In 1970, Galería de la Raza was founded by artists including García, Chuy Campusano, Ralph Maradiaga, Peter Rodríguez, René Yañez, Francisco X. Camplís, Gustavo Ramos Rivera, Carlos Loarca, Manuel Villamor, Robert Gonzales, Luis Cervantes, and Rolando Castellón. It was a non-profit art gallery and artist collective that featured Latino and Chicano artists in the Mission District of San Francisco.

In 1988, he taught in San Jose State University, in the school of art and art history department and retired in 2010. Since 2011 to present, he is the professor emeritus of Art, in San Jose State University.

His portfolio Beyond 1992, which included works such as Calavera Crystal Ball, served as "a stark rejoinder to the celebratory commemorations of Columbus’s 'discovery' of the 'New World' on its 500th anniversary." It was, he said, an event "that changed the world for the Mexicans for the worst and the Spaniards for the better."

In 2011, he exhibited at the de Young museum. His work is in the collection of the Museum of Modern Art, Smithsonian American Art Museum, Smithsonian National Portrait Gallery, National Gallery of Art, San Francisco Museum of Modern Art, Oakland Museum of California, Hood Museum of Art, and the Achenbach Foundation for Graphic Arts.

García printed the work Obama from Douglas in 2010. The work is printed inkjet on paper, and was made in collaboration with Magnolia editions, who García had worked with starting in the early 1990s. Printing with an inkjet, a fairly new process of printmaking at the time of the works creation, is removed from artist interaction, and requires no impact, but rather a spray of pigment onto paper by the machine. This method results in a higher quality print than that of traditional screen printing, as the color is more densely located. This also results in a work that looks photographic, making it effective in pieces such as this one that incorporates real, historical photographs.

The work is in a triptych format, with the leftmost of the three panels being an image of Barack Obama in a slightly abstracted, print graphic style. The middle panel is a composition with a white background crosshatched in many directions with lots of different, varied black strokes going across it. The image actually comes from a photograph that was taken of a print trimming mat. The mat was used by García as well as other artists used at the Magnolia editions Studio. The rightmost panel of the print is a photograph of Frederick Douglas taken in 1897 by George Kendall Warren. García's original idea for the work was to be a sole portrait of Barack Obama, and only later chose to incorporate Frederick Douglas and the print trimming mat in the final product. The final work then comes together to highlight and celebrate two black men with major impacts in American history. Additionally, both men are especially influential for their role in breaking barriers and making historical firsts, Douglas being the first African American to hold multiple positions in government, and Obama being the first African American president. The printing map between them draws connections and links between the two men, thought not perfectly straight or easy to follow connectors.

García made this work when he began to shift towards and embrace printmaking in a more digital way. Much of García's early work was created through hands on printmaking, or traditional screen printing. One advantage to digital printing is it is a much quicker process, and the specific stencils do not have to be hand designed and cut, and allows for a more intense and sometimes detailed composition.

Obama from Douglas is one of the most well known and emblematic works of García's move to the digital sphere, but he did not stop making silkscreens. Many of his works, both those printed by hand and those printed digitally, draw on the styles of pop art, and many of them art activists or politically charged works. The transition to digital mediums expanded García's ability to express activist thoughts and incorporate detail and richness of color.

García's work was included in the 2025 exhibition Photography and the Black Arts Movement, 1955–1985 at the National Gallery of Art.

== Solo exhibition ==
Solo exhibitions by Rupert García
2000	Politics and Provocation: The Posters of Rupert Garcia, Corcoran Gallery of Art, Washington, D.C., U.S.
2003	Another Look at the 1960s and 70s, Rena Bransten Gallery, San Francisco, California, U.S.
2006	Los Perros, Rena Bransten Gallery, San Francisco, California, U.S.
2011	Vintage Prints and Posters, Rena Bransten Gallery, San Francisco, California, U.S.
2011	The Magnolia Editions Projects 1991–2011, De Young Museum, San Francisco, California, U.S.
2018	Rupert Garcia: Rolling Thunder, Rena Bransten Gallery, San Francisco, California, U.S.

== Publications ==
- Catlett, Elizabeth; Castellon, Rolando (1978). Rupert Garcia: Pastel Drawings, March 3-April 23, 1978 (exhibition). San Francisco, California: San Francisco Museum of Modern Art.
