= Ralph Maradiaga =

American artist

- Born: Rafael Maradiaga; October 27, 1934; San Francisco, California, U.S.
- Died: July 19, 1985 (aged 50)
- Burial place: Holy Cross Cemetery (Colma, California)
- Education: San Francisco State University, Stanford University
- Movement: Bay Area Chicano Art Movement

Ralph Maradiaga (1934–1985) was an American artist, curator, photographer, printmaker, teacher, and filmmaker. He was Chicano, one of the co-founders of Galería de la Raza and part of the San Francisco Bay Area Chicano Art Movement.

== Biography ==
Ralph Maradiaga was born on October 27, 1934, in San Francisco, California. He had a BA degree (1971) and MA degree (1975) in printmaking from San Francisco State University and a MA degree (1975) in filmmaking from Stanford University.

He learned hand-cut silkscreen techniques from Rupert García, and he created his first poster in 1969. In 1970, he curated his first exhibition at Casa Hispana de Bellas Artes, a gallery space that was a precursor of Galería de la Raza. In 1970, Galería de la Raza was founded by artists Maradiaga, Rupert García, Peter Rodríguez, René Yañez, Francisco X. Camplis, Gustavo Ramos Rivera, Carlos Loarca, Manuel Villamor, Robert Gonzales, Luis Cervantes, Chuy Campusano, and Rolando Castellón.

== Death and legacy ==
Maradiaga died on July 19, 1985, while jogging at McLauren Park in San Francisco. He is buried at Holy Cross Cemetery. In the Mission District in San Francisco there is an urban park located on 24th Street dedicated in his honor, the Ralph Maradiaga Mini-Park.

Maradiaga's work can be found in public museum collections including at the Museum of Modern Art; the Smithsonian American Art Museum; the Museum of Fine Arts, Houston; the Los Angeles County Museum of Art; the National Museum of Mexican Art; and the McNay Art Museum.
