= Luis Cervantes =

Mexican footballer (born 2001)

Personal information
- Full name: Luis Roberto Cervantes Godínez
- Date of birth: 9 February 2001 (age 25)
- Place of birth: Guanajuato City, Guanajuato, Mexico
- Height: 1.74 m (5 ft 9 in)
- Position: Full-back

Team information
- Current team: Zacatecas (on loan from León)
- Number: 2

Youth career
- 2019–: León

Senior career*
Years	Team	Apps	(Gls)
2022–	León	19	(1)
2026–	→ Zacatecas (loan)	0	(0)
- * Club domestic league appearances and goals as of 19 September 2022

Luis Roberto Cervantes Godínez (born 9 February 2001) is a Mexican professional footballer who plays as a full-back for Liga de Expansión MX club Zacatecas, on loan from Liga MX club León.

== Career statistics ==
=== Club ===
As of 19 September 2022

Club	Season	League			Cup		Continental		Other		Total	
Club	Season	Division	Apps	Goals	Apps	Goals	Apps	Goals	Apps	Goals	Apps	Goals
León	2022–23	Liga MX	3	0	—		—		—		3	0
Career total			3	0	0	0	0	0	0	0	3	0
