= Derek Lerner =

American artist (born 1974)

- Born: March 2, 1974 (age 52); Jacksonville, Florida, U.S.
- Education: Douglas Anderson School of the Arts; Atlanta College of Art
- Known for: Art, Drawing, Public Art, Abstract Art, Video Art, Mixed Media Art
- Notable work: AVEX1-6(station) permanent public art MTA Arts & Design commission
- Style: Abstract, Conceptual, Multidisciplinary
- Website: dereklerner.com

Derek Lerner (born 1974) is an American contemporary artist primarily known for his ink on paper abstract drawings, currently living and working in New York City. Lerner's art has been exhibited nationally and internationally including; Robert Henry Contemporary in Brooklyn, NY, Rochester Contemporary Art Center, Montserrat Galleries – Montserrat College of Art in Beverly, MA, Museum of Contemporary Art – Chicago, Museo de la Ciudad de Mexico, Centre d'Exposition de Val-d'Or in Quebec, Canada and University of Massachusetts.

== Education and early life ==
Lerner was born on March 2, 1974, in Jacksonville, Florida. In 1988 his high school curriculum was a half-day program split between two schools, Ed White for standard academics and Westside Skills Center, where he studied commercial art. In 1990 Lerner transferred schools to study Visual art at Douglas Anderson School of the Arts, and later attended Atlanta College of Art (ACA) in 1992, graduating with a BFA in 1995. While at ACA, he studied art alongside Kara Walker, Radcliffe Bailey, Roe Ethridge, and William Downs. During Lerner's senior year of study at ACA he interned at The Interactive Media Technology Center (IMTC) at Georgia Tech, remaining there as a graphic and motion design staff member until exiting in 1995.

== Career ==
In 1994 while attending university Lerner cofounded Graphic Havoc, an award winning art direction and design company with Randall J Lane, which shortly thereafter grew to include David W Merten, Peter J Rentz, and Sadek Bazaraa. While functioning as a business owner, creative director, art director and graphic designer Lerner continued to create and exhibit his artwork. Lerner currently maintains an art studio in Brooklyn.

== Solo exhibitions ==
- 2001 DL27 SHOWROOM, New York, NY
- 2001 Ecko Unltd showroom, New York, NY
- 2003 ONEHUNDREDEIGHT Freestyle Drawings on Cardboard, Tomoya Saito Gallery, Ebisu, Tokyo, Japan
- 2012 RHV Fine Art, Brooklyn, NY
- 2014 Convenient Gratification, Robert Henry Contemporary, Brooklyn, NY
- 2015 VOLTA NY, Robert Henry Contemporary, New York, NY
- 2016 VOLTA12, Robert Henry Contemporary, Markthalle, Basel, Switzerland
- 2017 42°33'00.51" N 70°52'33.57" W, Curated by Leonie Bradbury, Montserrat Galleries – Carol Schlosberg Alumni Gallery, Beverly, MA
- 2017 In Between, Robert Henry Contemporary, Brooklyn, NY

== Group exhibitions ==
- 1994 Printmaking, Gallery 100, Atlanta, GA
- 1995 Drawing, gallery 100, Atlanta, GA
- 1995 Senior Exhibition, The Atlanta College of Art Gallery, Atlanta, GA
- 1999 transparent horizons, MACHINE collaboration, NEXUS Atlanta Contemporary Art Center, Atlanta, GA
- 2001 ARKITIP EXHIBITION002, Graphic Havoc collaboration, alife, New York, NY
- 2001 Krylon and Beyond 2, YoungBlood Gallery, Atlanta, GA
- 2001 Looser Graffiti, FAXWARS collaboration, YoungBlood Gallery, Atlanta, GA
- 2002 Coded Language, City Gallery Chastain, Atlanta, GA
- 2002 SK8 ON THE WALL, Graphic Havoc collaboration, Gallery Rocket, Tokyo, Japan
- 2002 the big group show, M3Projects Gallery, Graphic Havoc collaboration, New York, NY
- 2002 Triple Five Soul VS Graphic Havoc, 290 Lafayette St., New York, NY
- 2002 VERSION>02, Museum of Contemporary Art, Chicago, IL
- 2002 XHAND, 222gallery, Philadelphia, PA
- 2003 BLING, Derek Lerner and Tom Sanford, 31GRAND, Brooklyn, NY
- 2005 FUFI FUFI, TypeStereo & Freegums mobile gallery, Art Basel, Miami, FL
- 2005 Job 36:1, Graphic Havoc collaboration 222gallery, Philadelphia, PA
- 2005 My Moleskine, Tsutaya Tokyo Roppongi, Tokyo, Japan
- 2005 TRAFIC, Centre d'exposition de Val-d'Or, Val-d'Or (Québec)
- 2005WE BARTER, Life in a Box Project, Fabrica Features, Hong Kong
- 2006 Draw, curated by Erik Foss, Fuse Gallery, New York, NY
- 2006 Invitational Alumni Exhibition, Douglas Anderson School of the Arts, Jacksonville, FL
- 2007 Draw as part of the SXSW Music-Film + Interactive Festival, Gallery Lombardi, Austin, Texas
- 2007 Our Space CREAM 5th Anniversary, Kapok, Hong Kong
- 2008 Connected Unconscious, Brooklyn Academy of Music, Brooklyn, NY
- 2008 Draw, StolenSpace Gallery, London, UK
- 2009 Draw, Shooting Gallery, San Francisco, CA
- 2010 Conflux Festival, 5 block radius surrounding NYU's Barney Building, New York, NY
- 2010 August 7 screening, Berkeley Commonplace, Berkeley, CA
- 2010 Draw, curated by Erik Foss, Museo de la Ciudad de Mexico, Mexico City, Mexico
- 2010 FAD Digital Arts Festival, Quina Galeria, Edificio Maleta, downtown Belo Horizonte, Brazil
- 2010 Select Media Festival 9: Infoporn II, Co-Prosperity Sphere, Chicago, IL
- 2012 Mapping the Equivocal, Robert Henry Contemporary, Brooklyn, NY
- 2012 The 15 Year Anniversary Retrospective, Young Blood Gallery, Atlanta, GA
- 2015 Brooklyn Bridge, Rochester Contemporary Art Center, Rochester, NY
- 2016 PULSE – Contemporary Art Fair, Robert Henry Contemporary, Miami, FL
- 2017 Abstract Art in Dialogue, NYSID Gallery and organized by The Central Academy of Fine Arts, Co-curated by Dr. Zhijian Qian and Dr. Yu Ding, New York, NY
- 2017 INTERFERENCE, Bullet Space, curated by Alexandra Rojas, New York, NY
- 2017 Points of Departure; Meditations on Mapping, Mercer Gallery (Monroe Community College), curated by Colleen Buzzard and Karen Sardisco, Rochester, NY
- 2018 Shoot The Pump, Bullet Space, Curated by Lee Quiñones, Alexandra Rojas, and Andrew Castrucci, New York, NY
- 2019 Dataism, ArtsWestchester, Curated by Amy Kurlander and Lise Prown, White Plains, NY
- 2019 Datum Drawing, University of Massachusetts Amherst, Curated by Sandy Litchfield, Amherst, MA

== Commissions ==
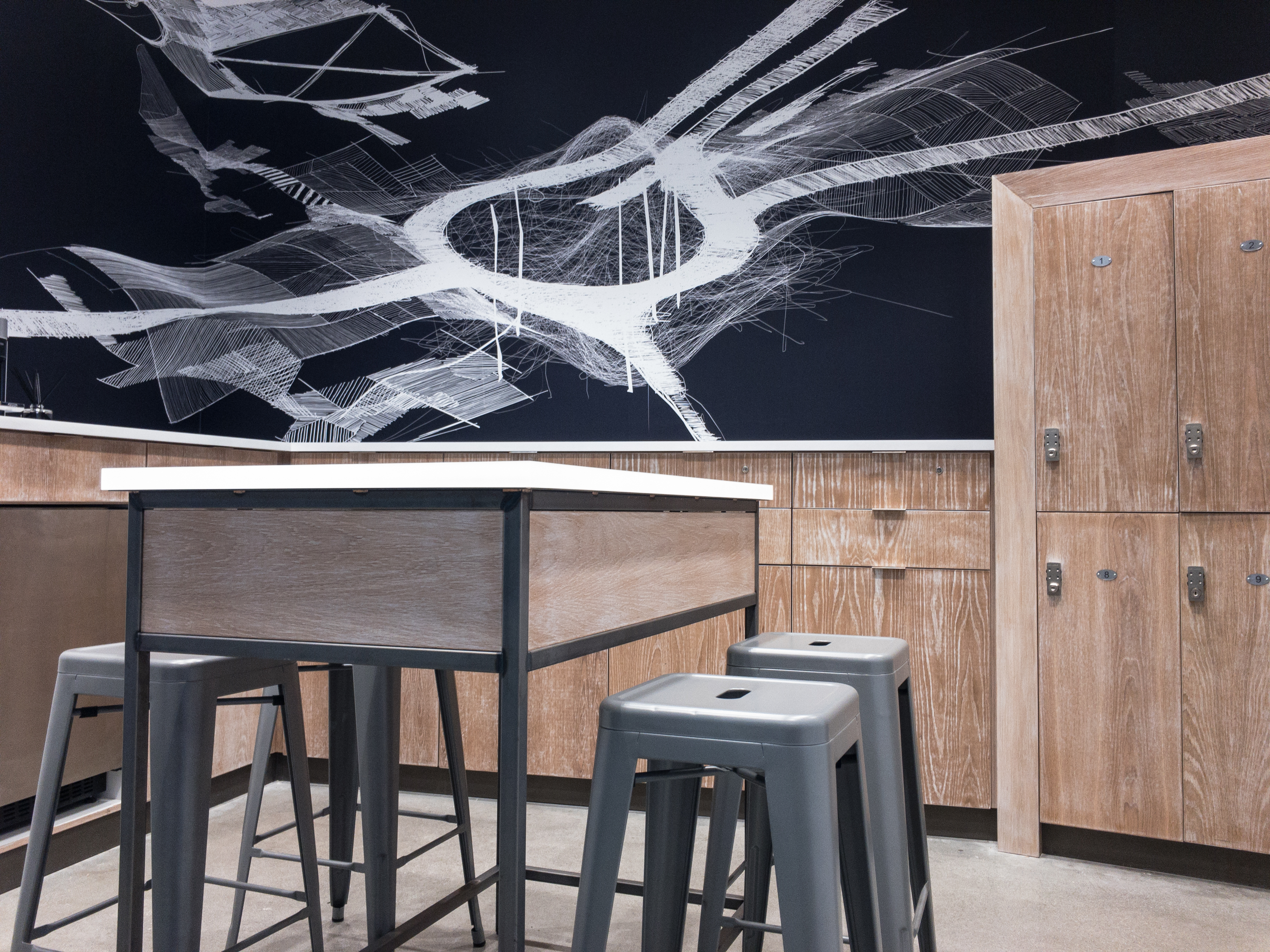
Infrastructure 2p1 by Derek Lerner 2018 site-specific artwork commission for Lululemon

- In 2015, MTA Arts & Design a division of the Metropolitan Transportation Authority commissioned Lerner to create permanent public art for the Avenue X subway station in Brooklyn. The artwork consists of six 48" x 150" multi-panel laminated glass compositions. As part of his MTA commission Lerner's artwork was additionally paired with a poem by Pulitzer Prize awarded & US Poet Laureate Charles Simic for Poetry in Motion bus and subway posters. The drawing and poem are included in the book titled, "The Best of Poetry in Motion: Celebrating 25 Years on Subways and Buses", published by W. W. Norton & Company.
- 2018 "Infrastructure 2p1", site-specific commission for Lululemon Athletica, Time Warner Center, Columbus Circle, New York City, 79" x 324" printed vinyl wall art installation.

== Recognition ==
In 2020 Lerner became a recipient of an NYSCA/NYFA Artist Fellowship for drawing.

== Artists' books ==
- 2018 CACHE¹, hardcover, 252 pages, edition of 10 signed and numbered – plus 6 A/Ps
- 2018 CACHE², hardcover, 252 pages, edition of 10 signed and numbered – plus 6 A/Ps

== Collections ==
- ElephanArt, Zurich Switzerland
- The Capital One Art Collection
- Norwegian Cruise Line Art Collection

== Bibliography ==
- 2002 Broken Wrist Project, Book 1, Los Angeles
- 2002 Derek Lerner SHOW&TELL Fig.A, "Digital Détournement", Select Magazine No. 3, Chicago, April
- 2002 The Elizabeth Kent Story, Brooklyn, Graphic Havoc
- 2003 Tray Butler, All in the wrist, "Shelf Space", Creative Loafing, Atlanta, February 12
- 2003 Übersee 2, "From Surface into Space", Die Gestalten Verlag, Berlin, February
- 2004 GH avisualagency, London, Booth-Clibborn Editions, ISBN 978-1-86154-268-7
- 2004 MAN VS. MACHINE by Graphic Havoc, "Technology", BIG No. 51, New York
- 2007 Interview with Derek Lerner, "Our Space", CREAM No. 08, Hong Kong, October
- 2014 ARTSEEN "DEREK LERNER Convenient Gratification" by Taney Roniger, "The Brooklyn Rail", July
- 2015 Brooklyn Bridge art exhibit at RoCo by Robin L. Flanigan, Democrat & Chronicle, September 6
- 2015 Derek Lerner and Bleu Cease. ROCO "Brooklyn Bridge" exhibition. Interview. WUHF Good Day Rochester. Fox Rochester. September 4. Television
- 2015 Spatial preoccupations "Brooklyn Bridge" By Rebecca Rafferty, Rochester City Newspaper, ARTS & ENTERTAINMENT, September 9
- 2017 Derek Lerner on His Drawings Show in Bushwick at Robert Henry Contemporary By Noah Becker, WHITEHOT Magazine, October
- 2018 For the Unconventional, interview, November
- 2019 "Fracture 13" drawing by Derek Lerner used as book cover art for Oxford University Press publication titled "Disorderly Borders: How International Law Shapes Irregular Migration" by Chantal J.M. Thomas ISBN 978-0-19-090877-5
- 2019 Robert Henry Contemporary : Studio Visit, interview, January
