= Mission Cultural Center for Latino Arts =

- U.S. National Register of Historic Places
- San Francisco Designated Landmark
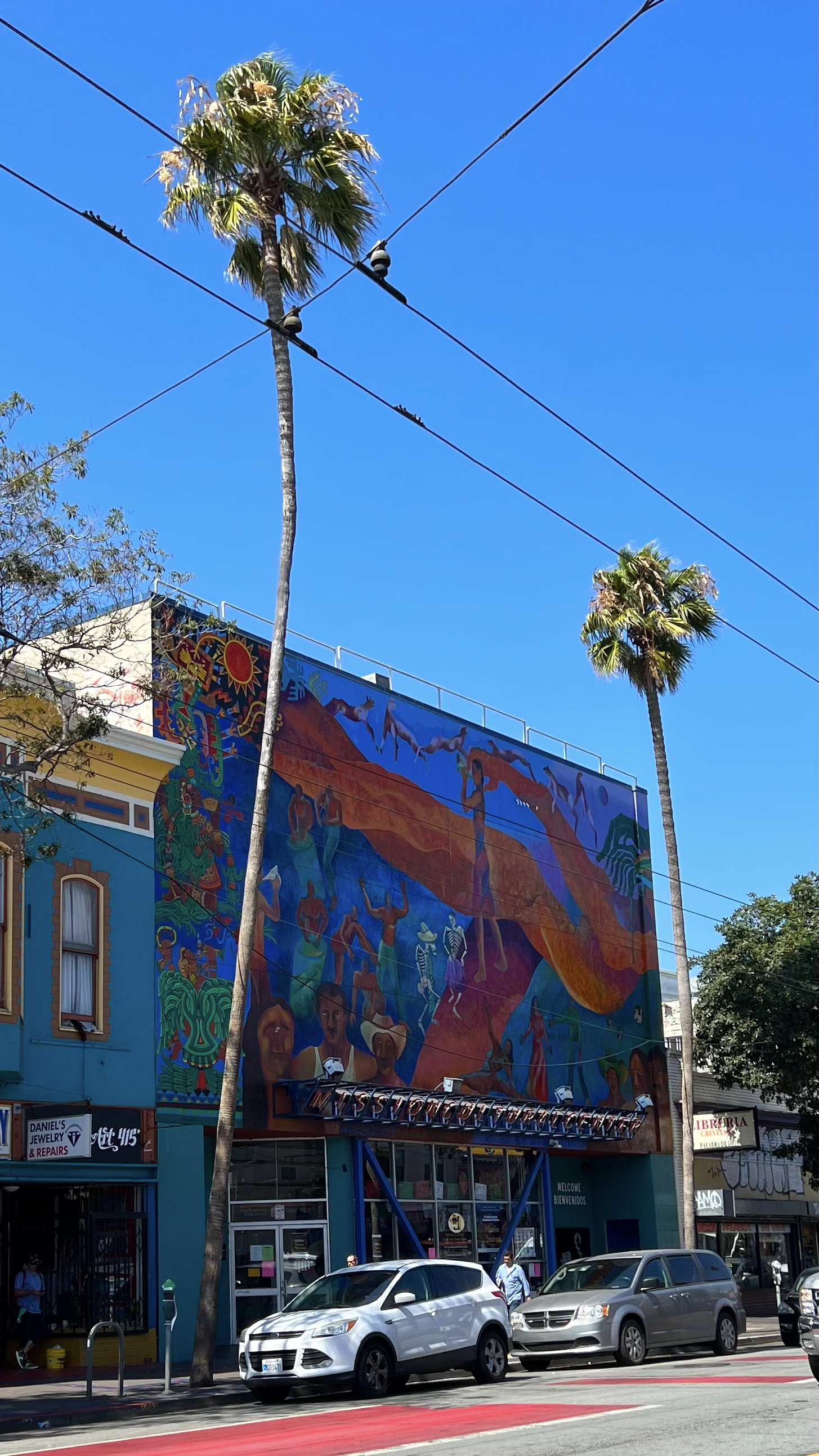

- Location within San Francisco Bay Area Location within California Location within the United States
- Location: 2868 Mission Street, San Francisco, CA 94110
- Coordinates: 37.751242°N 122.4205681°W
- Built: 1977
- Website: https://missionculturalcenter.org/
- NRHP reference No.: 100005987
- SFDL No.: 303

Significant dates
- Added to NRHP: 2020
- Designated SFDL: June 3, 2022

Mission Cultural Center for Latino Arts (MCCLA) was an arts nonprofit that was founded in 1977, and was located at 2868 Mission Street in the Mission District in San Francisco, California. They provided art studio space, art classes, an art gallery, and a theater. Their graphics department is called Mission Grafica, and features at studio for printmaking and is known for the hand printed posters. It was formerly named, Centro Cultural de La Mission.

The center closed permanently on January 28, 2026 after running out of funds.

The center's building was listed on the National Register of Historic Places on December 29, 2020; and listed as a San Francisco Designated Landmark since June 3, 2022.

== About ==
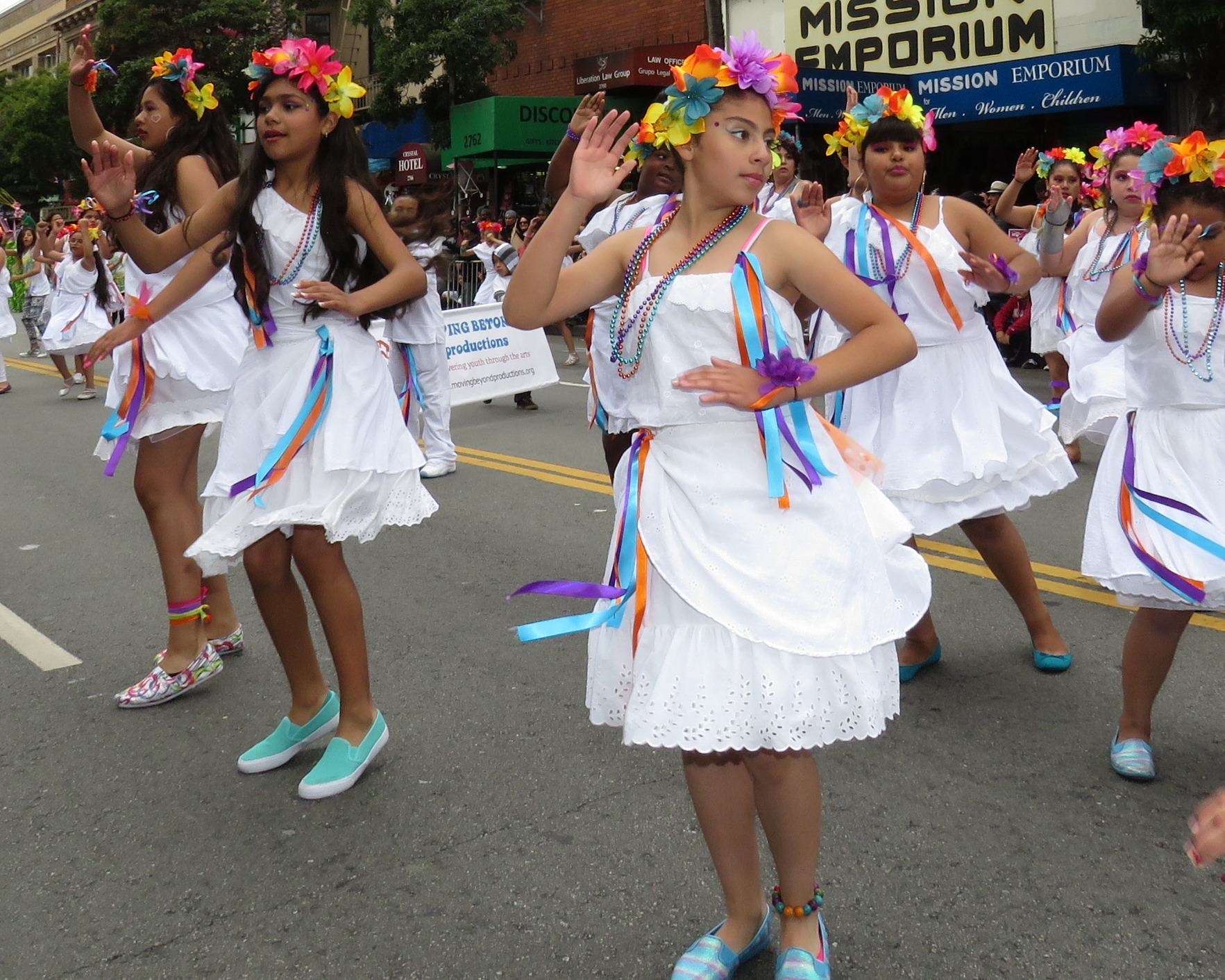
2015 Carnaval San Francisco Parade

Mission Cultural Center for Latino Arts (MCCLA) provides art studio spaces, art classes, an art gallery, and a theater.

MCCLA is active in the local community with supporting a series of annual events in the neighborhood such as the Carnaval parade, Dia de los Muertos, and others. Since 2003, MCCLA has been hosting an annual mole sauce competition. The MCCLA is very active in the annual Carnaval parade, teaching related dance classes, building floats for the parade, help with designing Carnaval costumes, creating banners and posters, and more. Additionally MCCLA is active in the annual Dia de los Muertos in the Mission District with erecting alters in Garfield Square park. They have hosted an annual neighborhood art exhibition in February, Corazón del Barrio, where local artists and craftsmen sell works, prints, jewels, pottery, and weaving.

The 40th anniversary of MCCLA was celebrated with an art exhibition attempted to expand the communities understanding of Latino experiences, “Here Now: Where We Stand,” (2017), curated by Anthony Torres. The exhibition included artists Juan Fuentes, Andrea Gomez, Art Hazelwood, Ester Hernandez, Yolanda Lopez, Calixto Robles, Michael Roman, Patricia Rodriguez, Jos Sances, Rene Yañez, amongst others.

== History ==
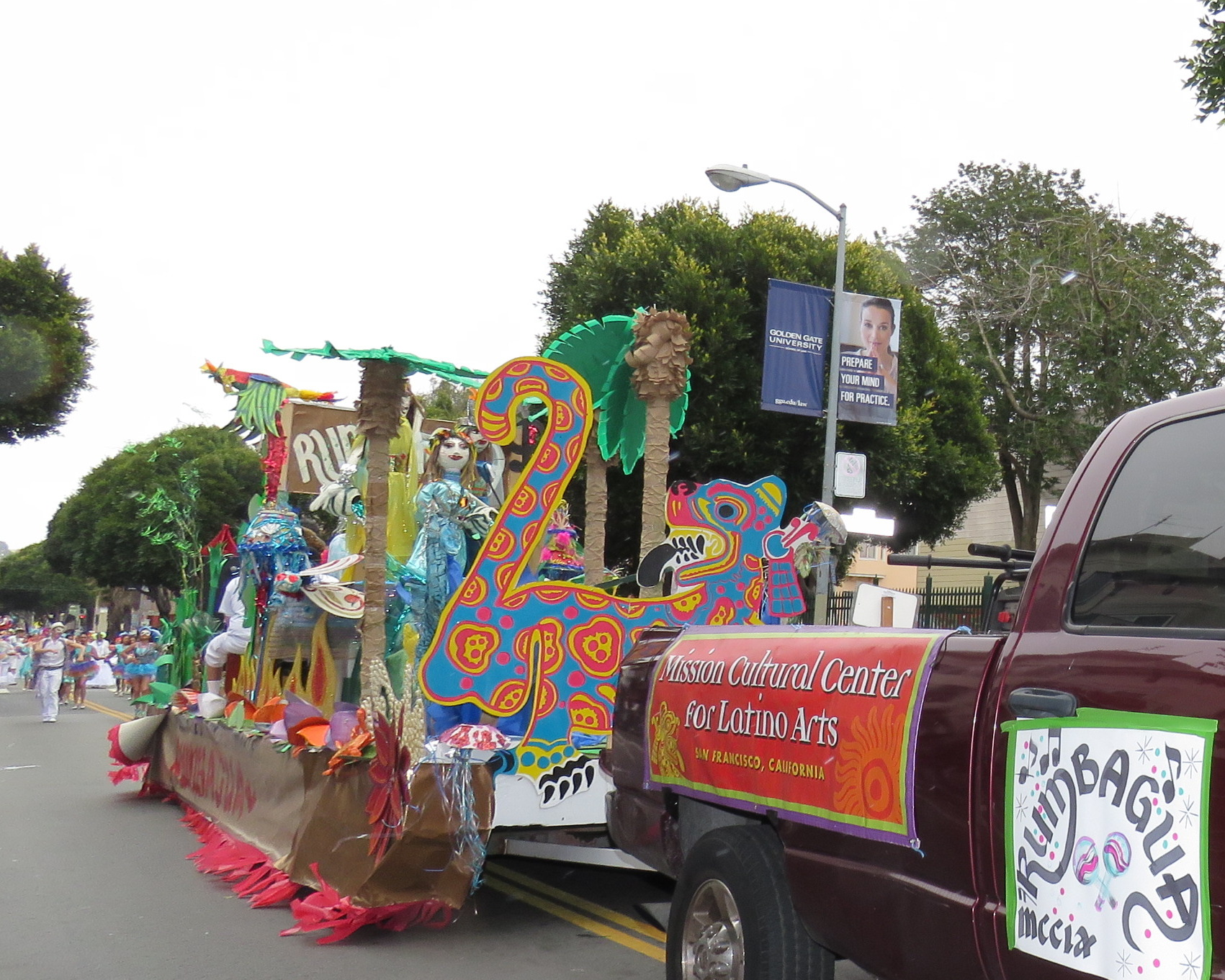
Mission Cultural Center for Latino Arts float at the 2015 Carnaval San Francisco Parade

The idea of a neighborhood community arts space had been in discussion starting in 1972. In 1976, the Mission Arts Alliance was formed, led by Alejandro Gato Murguia and their first meeting was with the San Francisco Arts Commission. A building was purchased by the city and prior to becoming the arts center, the building was used as a furniture store named "The Shaft". Mission Cultural Center for Latino Arts (MCCLA) was founded by 1977 by artists and community activists to promote the experiences of Chicano, Central American, South American, and Caribbean people.

Early artists active in the organization included many writers and poets such as Ernesto Cardenal, Nina Serrano, Roberto Vargas, and Raul Salinas. They called themselves the Pocho–Che group and they printed many political books and flyers including the Chicano zine El Pocho-Che. By 1978, a bulletin arrived from the Sandinista National Liberation Front calling for urgent action and support for the Nicaraguan Revolution. As a result, the leaders started to leave the Centro Cultural de La Mission group to participate in the Sandinista guerrilla offensive, and the new leadership for Centro Cultural de La Mission under Alfonso Maciel changed the direction away from political activities. By 1980 the Pocho-Che group had disbanded.

The graphics and printing department, Mission Grafica, was founded in 1982 by Jos Sances and Rene Castro.

Solo Mujeres, an annual exhibition since 1987 at Mission Cultural Center for Latino Arts. The Solo Mujeres 2020 exhibit includes Latino artists working with a variety of topics but holds a connection to the curatorial theme in relation to Gloria Anzaldua's writings. The curator for the 2020 exhibition, Martina Ayala chose to bridge connections to Gloria Anzaldua's writings pertaining to the Coatlicue State and Nepantlas, Coatlicue derives from the Mexica (mexihcah) culture and Coatlicue was an important goddess in Mexica society. Ayala uses the Aztec (Mexica) references "Nepantleras" that described a state of in-between. Some topics include femicide, healing, race, working class women, and disaster recovery.

The center closed on January 26, 2026 due to financial constraints.

== Notable artists ==
This is a list of notable artists affiliated with MCCLA.

- Jesus Barraza
- Andrea Gomez
- Elba Rivera
- Patricia Rodriguez
- Spain Rodriguez
- Herminia Albarrán Romero
- Jos Sances
- Nina Serrano
- Herbert Sigüenza
- Hank M. Tavera
- Yolanda Lopez
- Carlos Villa
- Rene Yañez
- Rio Yañez

== See also ==
- Chicano art movement
- List of museums in the San Francisco Bay Area
- List of San Francisco Designated Landmarks
- National Register of Historic Places listings in San Francisco
