= Yolanda López =

Mexican-American painter and activist (1942–2021)

- Born: November 1, 1942; San Diego, California, U.S.
- Died: September 3, 2021 (aged 78); San Francisco, California, U.S.
- Education: San Diego State University (BA); University of California, San Diego (MFA)
- Known for: Painting, prints
- Notable work: Reinterpretations of the Virgen de Guadalupe image, political poster "Who's the Illegal Alien, Pilgrim?"
- Movement: Bay Area Chicano art movement
- Children: Rio Yañez
- Awards: Ford Foundation and Mellon Foundation grant 2021 Latinx Artist Fellowship

Yolanda Margarita López (November 1, 1942 – September 3, 2021) was an American painter, printmaker, educator, and film producer. She was known for her Chicana feminist works focusing on the experiences of Mexican-American women, often challenging the ethnic stereotypes associated with them. Lopez was recognized for her series of paintings which re-imagined the image of the Virgen de Guadalupe. Her work is held in several public collections including the Smithsonian American Art Museum, the San Francisco Museum of Modern Art, and the Los Angeles County Museum of Art.

== Early life and education ==
Yolanda Margarita López was born on November 1, 1942, in San Diego, California, to Margaret Franco and Mortimer López. She was a third-generation Chicana. Her grandparents migrated from Mexico to the United States, crossing the Río Bravo river in a boat while avoiding gunfire from the Texas Rangers. López and her two younger siblings were raised by her mother and maternal grandparents in San Diego.

After graduating from high school in Logan Heights in San Diego, she moved to San Francisco and took courses at the College of Marin and San Francisco State University. She became involved in a student movement called the Third World Liberation Front, which shut down SFSU as a part of the Third World Liberation Front strikes of 1968 She also became active in the arts.

In 1969, López was instrumental in advertising the case of Los Siete de la Raza, in which seven young Latin American youths were accused of killing a police officer. Serving as the groups artistic director, she designed the poster "Free Los Siete," where the faces of these men are shown behind an inverted American flag that appears like prison bars. This poster was featured in the exhibition "¡Printing the Revolution!" at the Smithsonian American Art Museum, where curator Evelyn Carmen Ramos noted it had been "circulated at rallies and in newspapers, and galvanized the Mission District's Chicano and Latino community into a powerful social force with a noticeable presence in subsequent city politics."

During the 1970s, López returned to San Diego, and enrolled at San Diego State University in 1971, graduating in 1975 with a Bachelor of Arts degree in painting and drawing. She then enrolled at the University of California, San Diego, receiving a Master of Fine Arts in 1979. While at the University of California, San Diego, her professors Allan Sekula and Martha Rosler encouraged her to focus on conceptual practice with social, political, and educational impact.

== Career ==
López is recognized for her iconic series that reinterpreted the Virgen de Guadalupe through drawings, prints, collage, and paintings. The series, which depicted Mexican women (among them her grandmother, her mother, and López herself) with the mandorla and other Guadalupean attributes, attracted attention for sanctifying average Mexican women shown performing domestic and other forms of labor. In her 1978 triptych of oil pastel drawings, López depicted herself clutching a snake while stepping on an angel, a symbol of the patriarchy.

López created another set of prints with a similar theme entitled Woman's Work is Never Done. One of the artworks for the set, The Nanny, addressed problems faced by immigrant women of Hispanic descent in the United States and was featured at the Institute of Contemporary Art San José.

Her famous political poster titled Who's the Illegal Alien, Pilgrim? features a man in an Toltec headdress and traditional jewelry holding a crumpled-up paper titled "Immigration Plans." The layout recalls the Uncle Sam Wants You recruitment posters from World War I. This 1978 poster was created during a period of political debate in the U.S. which resulted in the passage of the Immigration and Nationality Act Amendments of 1978, which limited immigration from a single country to 20,000 people per year with a total cap of 290,000. The poster suggests that the ancestors of white Americans were themselves unwelcome immigrants. It also invokes the Aztec legend of Aztlán, which involved claims that the people indigenous to central Mexico had immigration rights to the traditional homelands of the Native Americans who were indigenous to the Southwestern United States. This piece was featured in ¡Printing the Revolution! exhibition as well. By using the image of an indigenous person, and the word pilgrim she combined politics with a symbol of significance in Mexican culture. There are two versions of this image. The original 1978 version was in response to Jimmy Carters immigration plan, but there's a reprinted version from 1981 and 1994. The new reprints were used due to proposition 187 in California. This proposition requested the termination of education and healthcare to undocumented immigrants. https://americanart.si.edu/artist/yolanda-lopez-31731

López also curated exhibitions, including Cactus Hearts/Barbed Wire Dreams, which featured works of art concerning immigration to the United States. The exhibition debuted at the Galería de la Raza and subsequently toured nationwide as part of an exhibition called La Frontera/The Border: Art About the Mexico/United States Border Experience.

López produced two films: Images of Mexicans in the Media and When you Think of Mexico, which challenged the way the mass media depicts Mexicans and other Latin Americans.

She served as Director of Education at the Mission Cultural Center for Latino Arts in San Francisco, and taught at University of California, Berkeley, University of California San Diego, Mills College, and Stanford University.

López stated, "It is important for us to be visually literate; it is a survival skill. The media is what passes for culture in contemporary U.S. society, and it is extremely powerful. It is crucial that we systematically explore the cultural mis-definition of Mexicans and Latin Americans that is presented in the media."

She was awarded a $50,000 fellowship from The Andrew W. Mellon Foundation and the Ford Foundation as part of their Latinx Artist Fellowship in 2021. A retrospective exhibition of Lopez work was scheduled to be held at the Museum of Contemporary Art San Diego in October 2021.

Artwork created by Lopez is in the collection of the Smithsonian American Art Museum. Her artwork is held in the public collections of several museums including the San Francisco Museum of Modern Art the Los Angeles County Museum of Art, the Ulrich Museum of Art, the De Young Museum, and the Oakland Museum of California.

== Selected artwork ==
=== The Guadalupe series ===
Beginning in 1978 and ending in 1988, López created a series of images that reinterpreted the Virgen de Guadalupe. López earned recognition for the sieries which depicted people close to her as the Virgen de Guadalupe and reinvigorated the image into different forms. The artwork drew attention with the new, albeit controversial, depictions of the Virgen de Guadalupe. However, starting a controversy was not López's intention. In "American Women: Great lives from History", author Mary K. Trigg writes, "López's formal education and burgeoning feminism contributed to her growing interest in the politics of representation, resulting in work that progressively examined the social and cultural invisibility of women". López wanted to depict the Virgen de Guadalupe in numerous ways in order to give women, specifically those originating from Chicana culture, new forms of representation along with López's own comments on society. As Guisela M. Latorre argues, "[i]mages such as Ester Hernandez's 1976 etching Libertad depicting a young Chicana resculpting the Statue of Liberty to resemble a Maya carving, and Yolanda López's pastel drawings (1978) that depicted herself, her mother, and her grandmother in the role of the Virgin of Guadalupe were examples of early Chicana art that placed women at the center of discourses on liberation and decolonization".

==== The Virgen de Guadalupe ====
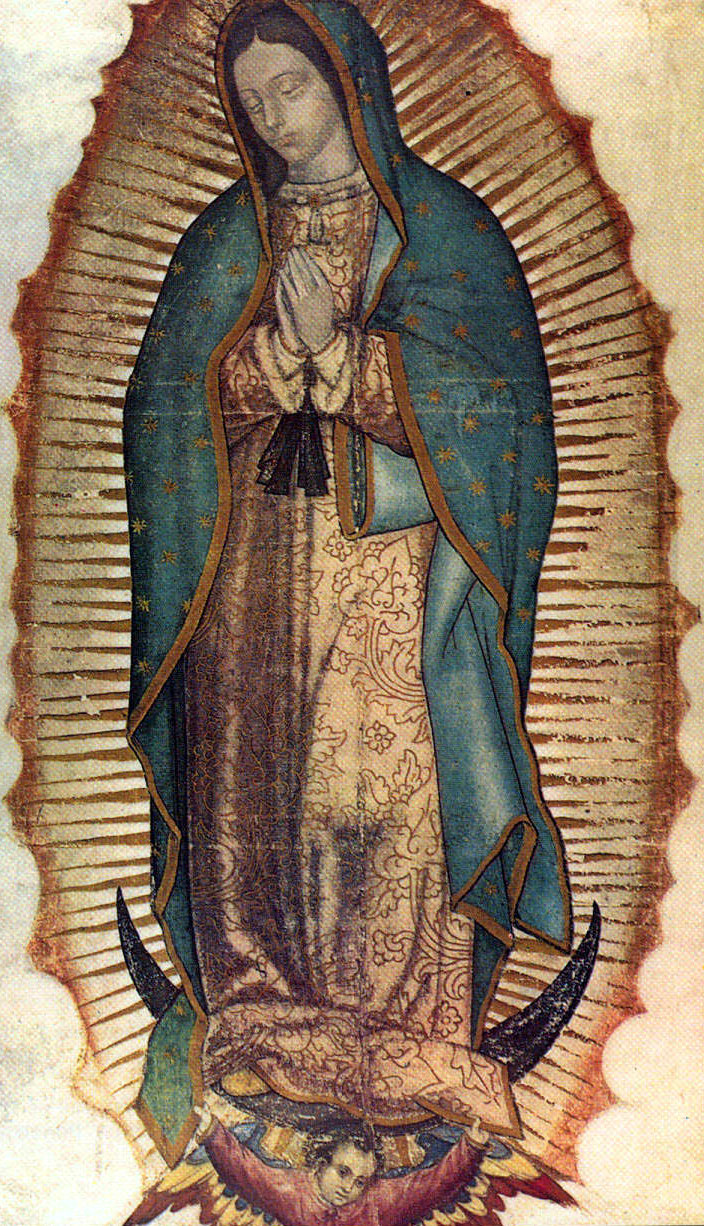
a traditional depiction of the Virgen de Guadalupe

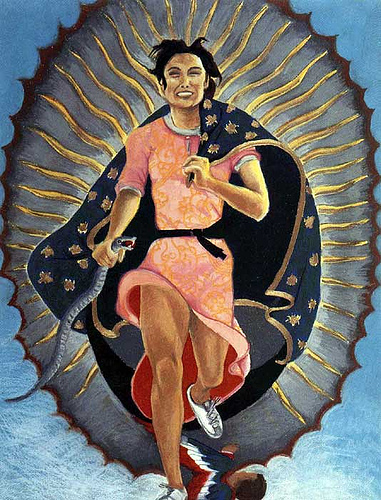
Yolanda López, Portrait of the Artist as the Virgen of Guadalupe, 1978, from the Guadalupe series.

López sought to depict the Virgen de Guadalupe in multiple ways due to the religious figures symbolic meaning. It is one of the most recognizable religious figures in the world and one of the most important figures to the people of Mexico. She is a symbol of love, faith, and identity. However, not all the symbolism could be perceived as purely positive; the Virgen de Guadalupe also symbolizes motherhood, virginity, and femininity, which López felt the need to not only address but also critique in her work. In "Yolanda López: Breaking Chicana stereotypes", Betty Laduke observes that López stated: "I feel living, breathing women also deserve the respect and love lavished on Guadalupe... It is a call to look at women, hardworking, enduring and mundane, as the heroines of our daily routine... We privately agonize and sometimes publicly speak out on the representation of us in the majority culture. But what about the portrayal of ourselves in our own culture? Who are our heroes, our role models?... It is dangerous for us to wait around for the dominant culture to define and validate what role models we should have."

Traditional images of the Virgen de Guadalupe stress religious symbolic meaning primarily maternity, reinforcing gender roles. López redesigned a powerful cultural icon in order to shift the observer's point of view by providing an alternative interpretation. López expressed that in images of the original Virgin, she is "bound by the excess cloth around her legs that makes her immobile".

The Artist as the Virgen of Guadalupe painting shows López herself running out of the picture frame, smiling with her running shoes as if competing in a race, wearing Mary's shawl as a cape, and jumping over the red, white, and blue angel, showing pride in her culture, and finally holding a snake to demonstrate the strength she holds. López explained this imagery, saying "[s]he holds the Guadalupe cloak like a cape at the end of a race and jumps over the angel with red, white, and blue wings a symbol of the United States capitalism". In "Yolanda López: Breaking Chicana Stereotypes" Laduke explains, "López not only commands her body but seems to predict her role as an artist who is not afraid of encountering social and political issues or using her skills to promote social change". López is not afraid to challenge society or to change what has been falsely represented in Mexican culture, through images of the Virgin Mary, and through images projecting how young women and mothers should look or behave a certain way. Through her art, López challenged her culture. As Karen Mary Davalos, a scholar of Chicano studies, asserts, "López consistently confronts predominant modes of Latino and Latina representations, proposing new models of gender, racial, and cultural identity". Regarding her intended viewer, López stated "Over the years as I have created my art, I have tried to address an audience, a Chicano audience, specifically a California Chicano audience".

López's Nuestra Madre (1981–88, acrylic and oil paint on masonite), a portrait in the Virgin of Guadalupe series, shows a stone figure as the portrait of an ancient goddess. During the 16th-century, the Virgin of Guadalupe was seen as connected to the goddess Tonantzin, an ancient Aztec goddess the Mexican people worshiped in Tepeyac prior to the Spanish colonization of Mexico. Tonantzin was disguised so the Spaniards would retain her as a religious image acceptable to their imported religion of Roman Catholicism. López removed the disguise of the Virgin of Guadalupe, placed on Tonantzin by the colonizers. She sought to restore Mexican history and remind Chicano/as of their hidden past. In Lopez's revised image, the icon is seen as a protector and leader. Davalos explains, López's "intent was not to explore the Virgen de Guadalupe's divinity but to deconstruct the image 'to see how we present ourselves'. López's deconstruction of images of women such as the Virgen de Guadalupe was an effort to acknowledge the complex social and historical conditions that inform the experiences of Mexican and Mexican American women". In one specific image she portrays her mother, Margaret Stewart, sewing the Virgin's starred mantle. Some other iconic elements of the Virgin de Guadalupe image appear including the Halo above her head and the image of Juan Diego at her feet.

==== ¿A Donde Vas, Chicana? ====
While attending the University of California, San Diego, Lopez created the ¿A Donde Vas, Chicana?, Spanish for "Where are you going, Chicana?", Getting through College series as part of her MFA exhibition in 1977. The four by five feet canvas painted with acrylic and oil portrays a toned Lopez as the runner jogging intensely across a college campus in a tank top and shorts with her hair pulled back. She based this painting on her experience of running to get in shape and have control over her body. In the journal article "Yolanda Lopez: Breaking Chicana Stereotypes", Betty LaDuke interviews Lopez and she informs us that the series was presented from the perspective of "a woman calling on her body in an assertive and physically disciplined manner as a power ally. She commented on the runner's noteworthiness saying, "It is female. It is Chicana. It is a self-portrait. The metaphor extends from the symbolic fortitude of women to the literal image of a Chicana's struggle in a formidable institution." Lopez compared a runner's "short-lived speed with women's psychological and physical sustaining power of endurance" and stated that "Endurance is one of our greatest survival tools."

=== Things I never told my son about being a Mexican ===
Things I never told my Son about being a Mexican was a featured as a piece in López's exhibition Cactus Hearts/Barbed Wire Dreams in 1988. The piece touches on identity, assimilation, and cultural change; it consists of three-dimensional items including cactus cutouts and children's clothing attached to a large yellow backdrop with a zigzag border on the top and a barbed wire border on the bottom. The bottom text reads: "THINGS I NEVER TOLD MY SON ABOUT BEING A MEXICAN". The work's message ranges from embracing one's culture to addressing the oppression and discrimination faced in America, as the two borders depicted in the artwork are suggestive of the literal borders between the United States and Mexico. It can also be connected to López's "culture shock" experience after going to college, where she realized that she knew nothing about her own Mexican heritage or cultural history.

Things I never told my son about being a Mexican addressed her son, Río Yañez, who was nine years old at the time. In the artwork, a textured and three dimensional mixed media collage, children's clothes protrude from the warm yellow background wall, with barbed wire depicted from an aerial perspective. As Karen Mary Davalos, argues, "López intentionally selected these objects for their mundane or everyday quality so that she could support her argument about the ubiquitous nature of stereotypical images. The images of sleeping Mexicans, smiling señoritas, and dancing fruits and vegetables are made absurd through unexpected placement, juxtaposition, and repetition. Her work interrogates images of Mexicans and Chicanos, and it challenges not only the context in which fine art is displayed but also the assumptions about who should be invited into such elite spaces."

== Personal life ==
In 1978, López and conceptual artist René Yañez moved to San Francisco's Mission District, and in 1980 she gave birth to Rio Yañez. A few years later, López moved into the apartment next door and maintained a professional relationship with Yañez. After 40 years of living in her home, in 2014, she and her family faced eviction through the Ellis Act. In response, she created a series of "eviction garage sales" to comment on issues of gentrification and cultural heritage in San Francisco. According to the UCLA Chicano Studies Research Center Press (2009), "López's artwork aims to offer new possibilities for Chicanas and women of color living under conditions of patriarchy, racism, and material inequality." Her contributions to Chicana society and feminism are seen as significant.

López died on September 3, 2021, in San Francisco, California, at the age of 78 due to cancer.

== Select exhibitions ==
- 1993 – La Frontera / The Border: Art about the Mexico/United States Border Experience, Museum of Contemporary Art San Diego, San Diego, California
- 1997 – Mirror, Mirror... Gender Roles and the Historical Significance of Beauty, San Jose Institute of Contemporary Art, San Jose, California
- 2008 – A Declaration of Immigration, group exhibition, National Museum of Mexican Art, Chicago, Illinois
- 2008 – Women's Work is Never Done, solo exhibition, Mission Cultural Center for Latino Arts (MCCLA), San Francisco, California
- 2011 – Mex/L.A.:Mexican Modernisms in Los Angeles, 1930–1985, Museum of Latin American Art, Long Beach, California.
- 2017 – Here Now: Where We Stand, group exhibition, Mission Cultural Center for Latino Arts (MCCLA), San Francisco, California
- 2017–18 – Radical Women: Latin American Art, 1960–1985, Hammer Museum, Los Angeles and Brooklyn Museum, Brooklyn, New York.
- 2021 – Portrait of the Artist, Museum of Contemporary Art San Diego, San Diego, California

== See also ==
- Chicano art movement
- Chicana Art
- Chicano Art: Resistance and Affirmation
