= David H. Wells =

David H. Wells is a photographer and film-maker affiliated with Aurora Photos.

== Life and work ==
Wells received a B.A in Liberal Arts from Pitzer College of the Claremont Colleges, Claremont, CA. He has taught classes at the University of Pennsylvania and University of Rhode Island, and workshops at the Maine Media Workshops. He is on the faculty of the International Center for Photography in New York City. He was featured in Photo District News as a "Best Workshop Instructor." He served as a judge for the Alexia Foundation in 1996.

Wells works across North America, Europe, the Middle East and Asia. He is affiliated with Aurora Photos of Portland, ME, since 2003. He has worked as a workshop instructor at Maine Media Workshops, Unique Photo, CreativeLive, Centro de la Imagen, in Mexico City Pathshala school of photography in Dacca, Bangladesh, and Objectifs, Singapore Center for Film and Photography.

== Publications with contributions by Wells ==
- Live Like the Banyan Tree: Images of the Indian American Experience. Catalogue for the Balch Institute of Ethnic Studies, Philadelphia, PA, 1999. ISBN 1422358216.

== Awards ==
- “New Faces” Award, American Photographer, 1988.
- Nikon/National Press Photographers' Association Documentary Sabbatical Grant, 1988.
- Visual Arts Fellowship from the Pennsylvania Arts Council, 1989.
- Fulbright Lecturing Fellowship at University of Mysore, Mysore, India, 1999.
- Alicia Patterson Foundation Fellowship, 2001
- Fulbright Regional Studies Research Fellowship, Bangladesh, India, Sri Lanka 2005.
- Prix de la Photographie, Paris, Water Competition, Honorable Mention, 2008.
- Hearst 8x10 Photography Biennial, New York City, Honorable Mention, 2009.
- Forward Thinking Museum Photography Contest, New York City, Runner Up, 2012.
- American Society of Media Photographers Best of 2014.

== Selected solo exhibitions ==
- Concurrence: An Evolving India, Frontier Gallery, Brunswick, ME, 08/09-9/09.
- Concurrence: An Evolving India, Chazan Gallery, Providence, RI, 11/09 – 12/09.
- Foreclosed Dreams, Torpedo Factory, Alexandria, VA, 08/10 – 09/10.
- Underwater: Interpreting the Foreclosure Crisis, Artspace, Raleigh, NC, 09/12 – 10/12.
- Foreclosed Dreams, Yellow Peril Gallery, Providence, R.I, 04/13 – 05/13.
- Foreclosed Dreams, Montserrat College of Art, Beverly, MA. 11/13 – 12/13.
- Half, Past, Watson Institute at Brown University, Providence, RI, 8/14 – 9/14.
- Foreclosed Dreams, Monmouth University, Monmouth, N.J. 9/14 – 10/14.

== Selected group exhibitions ==
- No Place Like Home, Paul Robeson Galleries at Rutgers, Newark, N.J. 1/13–4/13.
- Stories in the Social Landscape, International Center of Photography, New York, N.Y. 12/13-–3/14.
