= Jos Sances =

American artist and activist (born 1952)

- Born: John Joseph Sances; August 18, 1952 (age 74); Boston, Massachusetts
- Education: Montserrat College of Art
- Website: www.josart.net

John Joseph "Jos" Sances (born August 18, 1952) is an American artist, activist, writer, and community organizer, known for his printmaking, and tile murals/public art . He is the founder and director of Alliance Graphics. Sances is based in Berkeley, California.

== Biography ==
John Joseph Sances was born August 18, 1952, in Boston, Massachusetts, to a Sicilian-American family. He studied at Montserrat School of Visual Arts (now Montserrat College of Art).

He came to California in 1976 and became active in art and politics. In the late 1970s, Sance was active with the Galería de la Raza and the La Raza Silkscreen Center. In 1982, Sances co-founded Mission Grafica at the Mission Cultural Center for Latino Arts.

In 1989, Sances founded Alliance Graphics, a Berkeley-based union screen print shop. Profits from Alliance Graphics support the parent organization, the Middle East Children's Alliance (MECA).

His work, Or, The Whale (2019) was in the 2019 exhibition, Here is the Sea at Richmond Art Center. Or, The Whale was created on 119 panels. When assembled together they form a 14 feet high by 51 feet wide scratchboard with the image of a sperm whale with the illustrated history of capitalism in America inside of the whale.

Sances is a member of the food-based art group The Great Tortilla Conspiracy making tortilla art, other members include Rio Yañez, René Yañez, and Art Hazelwood.

Sances' work can be found in various public museum collections, including Smithsonian American Art Museum, Birmingham Museum of Art, American Labor Museum in Haledon, New Jersey, Oakland Museum of California (OMCA), Fine Arts Museums of San Francisco, among others.

Sances' screenprints, his own images and images printed for other artists, are included in Mission Grafica: Reflecting a Community in Print by Art Hazelwood.

== Murals ==
Year	Title	Artists	Location	Notes
1991–1994		Jos Sances, Daniel Galvez	Oakland Coliseum, Oakland, California	4 murals
1996		Jos Sances	Oakland Coliseum, Oakland, California	9 murals
2003	Future Roads	Jos Sances, Daniel Galvez	16th Street BART station, San Francisco, California	A screen printed tile mural around the entrance of the esclators.
2006	Youthful Transformation	Jos Sances, Daniel Galvez	Juvenile Justice Center, Main Corridor, San Leandro, California	A digital tile mural.
2008	On the Right Track	Jos Sances, Daniel Galvez	Richmond BART/Amtrak/AC Transit station, Richmond, California	A series of tile murals.
2009		Jos Sances, Art Hazelwood	Arnett Watson Apartments, San Francisco, California	A tile mural
2009		Jos Sances	Castro Valley Library, Castro Valley, California	A tile mural
2010		Jos Sances	Ira Jenkins Park, Oakland, California	
2019		Jos Sances	Shadelands Sports Complex, Walnut Creek, California	A 1500 sq.ft. tile mural.
