= Rio Yañez =

American curator and artist (born 1980)

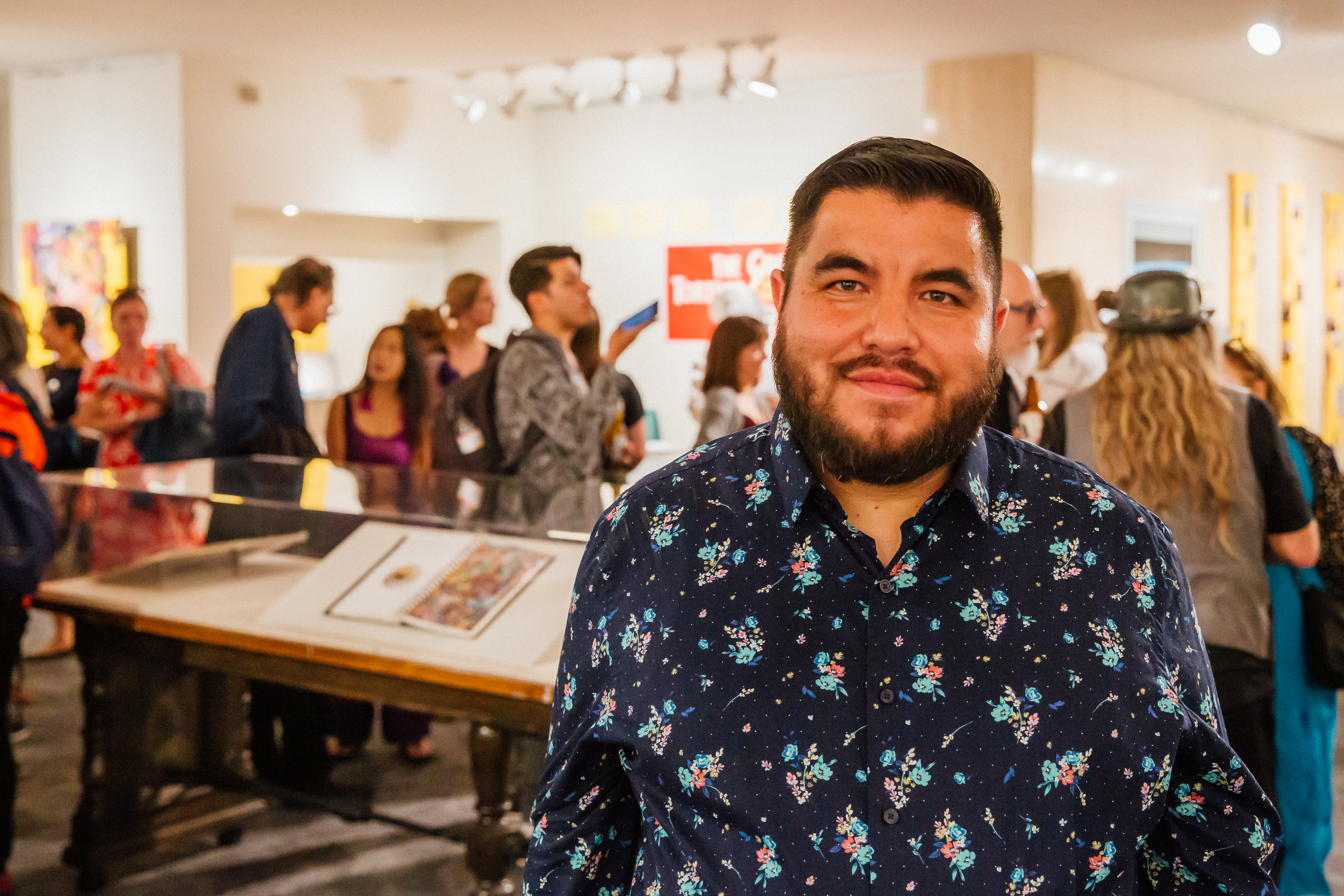
- Born: 1980 (age 44–45); San Francisco, California, U.S.
- Education: California Institute of the Arts
- Known for: Curator, artist
- Parents: René Yañez (father); Yolanda Lopez (mother)
- Website: rioyanez.com

Rio Yañez (born in 1980) is an American curator and artist. He is based in the San Francisco Bay Area.

== Biography ==
Rio Yañez was born in 1980 at San Francisco General Hospital in San Francisco, California to artists Yolanda Lopez and René Yañez. His parents separated after a few years but they remained as neighbors in the same building in the Mission District in San Francisco. Yañez attended California Institute of the Arts and received a BFA degree in 2005. Rio and René Yañez collaborated on art for many years, starting in 2005. He has been active with his art at Galeria de la Raza, SOMArts, Mission Cultural Center for Latino Arts, among others.

Yañez was a member of the food-based art group The Great Tortilla Conspiracy making tortilla art, other members include Joseph "Jos" Sances, René Yañez, and Art Hazelwood.

In 2014, Rio Yañez moved to the Fruitvale neighborhood of Oakland. After his father died in 2018, Rio took up the role as co-curator of the annual Día de los Muertos in the Mission District.
