= Montserrat College of Art =

Private art school in Beverly, Massachusetts

- Former name: Montserrat School of Visual Arts
- Motto: Where Creativity Works ®
- Type: Private art school
- Established: 1970; 56 years ago
- Founder: North Shore Community Arts Foundation
- Accreditation: NECHE; NASAD
- Academic affiliations: AICAD
- Endowment: $1.37 million (2020)
- President: Brian Pellinen
- Undergraduates: 374 (2019)
- Location: 23 Essex Street, Beverly, Massachusetts, 01915, United States; 42°33′1.21″N 70°52′35.54″W
- Campus: Suburban
- Colors: Blue and green
- Mascot: Rat
- Website: www.montserrat.edu

Montserrat College of Art is a private art school in Beverly, Massachusetts. It is accredited by the New England Commission of Higher Education and the National Association of Schools of Art and Design.

== History ==
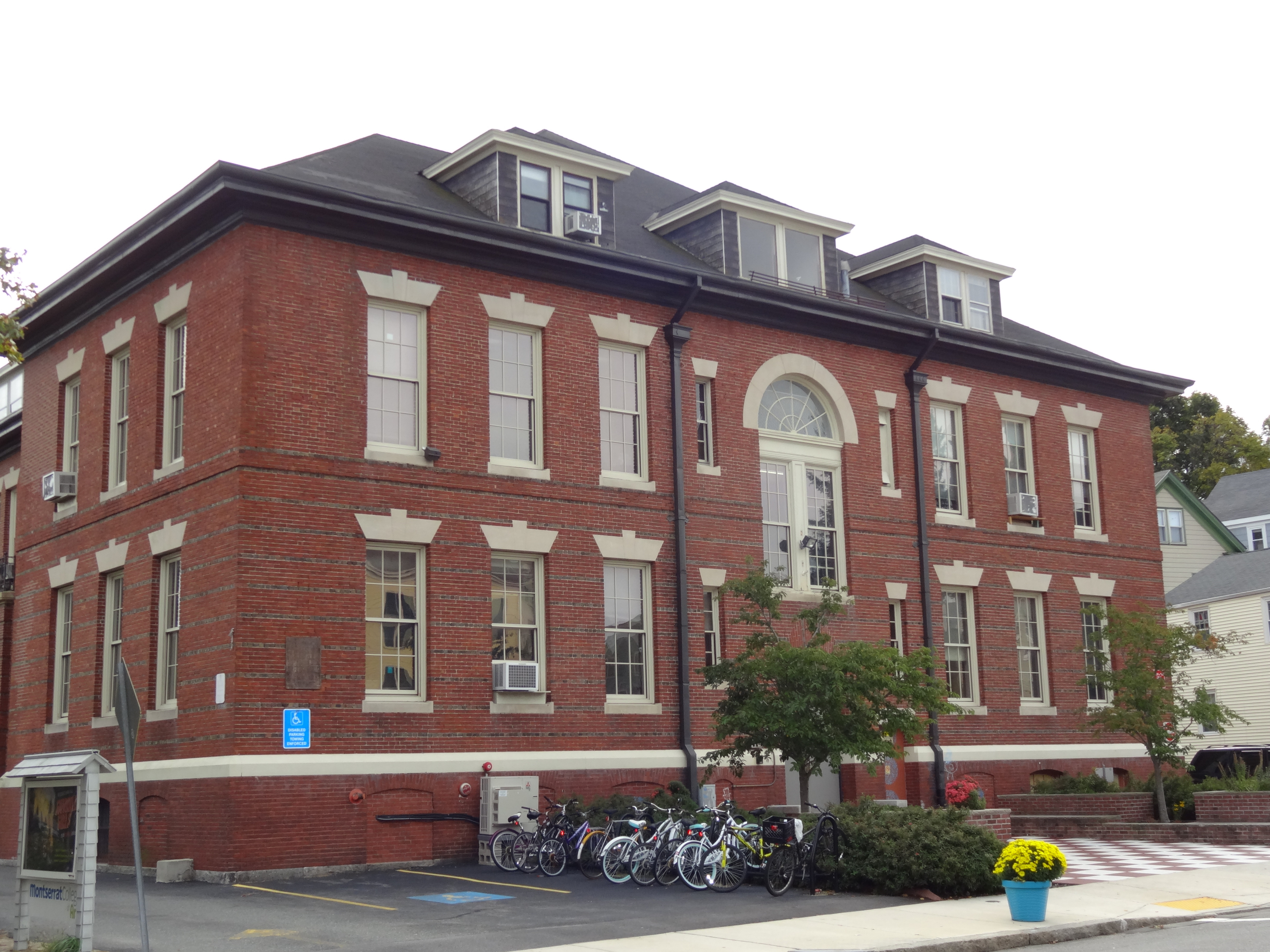
View of the Hardie Building in 2012.

The school was established in 1970 as Montserrat School of Visual Arts and was founded by the North Shore Community Arts Foundation, a civic organization that managed the nearby North Shore Music Theatre. Joseph Jeswald, a local artist and former head of the Fine Arts Department at New England School of Art and Design, was chosen to serve as the first president of the school and Stephen Slane, one of the founders of the Arts Foundation along with C. Henry Glovsky and Ruby Newman, was named managing director. The school was accredited as a college and authorized to award a Bachelor of Fine Arts degree in the mid-1980s, at which time it changed to its name to the Montserrat College of Art. In 1992, the school moved to its present location on Essex Street in the Hardie Building, a renovated nineteenth-century school structure that serves as the campus center.

In early 2015, Montserrat College of Art explored a possible merger with Salem State University, a large public university in neighboring Salem. After some months of research and negotiations, the proposal was found to be not feasible and the plan was dropped in mid-2015.

For one year, William J. Bakrow served as interim president of Montserrat College of Art. In 2018, Kurt T. Steinberg was named the eighth president in school history.

== Academics ==
Montserrat College of Art offers Bachelor of Fine Arts degrees. Montserrat College of Art's acceptance rate is 68% (2026).

The school has study abroad programs for its students in Niigata, Japan, Ballyvaughan, Ireland, and Mallorca, Spain. Additionally, the school offers continuing education courses and workshops in such subjects as painting and photography.

== Campus ==
The Montserrat College of Art is located in downtown Beverly. The small campus includes the central Hardie Building on 23 Essex Street, a classroom, gallery, studio, and office space building on 248 Cabot Street, a full equipped sculpture shop & digital fabrication studio at 301 Cabot Street, and apartment-style residence halls. In 2009, the Helena J. Sturnick Student Residence Village was opened. As of 2024, the college campus consists of a total of fourteen academic and residential buildings.

The school is home to six public galleries, which are free to the public: the Frame 301 Gallery; the Bare Gallery; the Carol Schlosberg Gallery; the Founders Gallery; the Montserrat Gallery; and Library Gallery. The spaces exhibit a variety of works by international, national, regional, and local artists. Past exhibitions have featured artists such as Clint Baclawski, Hunter Cole, Jess T. Dugan, Sally Heller, Yun-Fei Ji, Valeri Larko, Derek Lerner, Vanessa Platacis, Cynthia von Buhler, Leigh Wiener, and David H. Wells.

The Paul M. Scott Library is part of the North of Boston Library Exchange consortium.

== Notable alumni ==
- Carlos Dorrien (1974), sculptor
- Jos Sances (1976), artist
- Carol Schlosberg (1990), painter
- Mary Pennington (Updike) Weatherall, painter

== See also ==
- List of art schools
- List of colleges and universities in Massachusetts
