= Sally Heller =

American artist

- Born: Sally Heller; 1956 (age 69–70); New Orleans, Louisiana, US
- Education: University of Wisconsin, Virginia Commonwealth University
- Known for: painting, collage, installation
- Website: sallyheller.com

Sally Heller (born 1956) in New Orleans, LA. She is known for the use of everyday materials to make large installations that are often site-specific.

== Early life and education ==
Sally Heller was born and raised in New Orleans, LA. Her undergraduate studies at the University of Wisconsin, Madison resulted in a B.S. in Art. Her M.F.A. was from Virginia Commonwealth University Department of Painting and Printmaking in 1980 and coincided with the first public exposure of her work in the "Louisiana Major Works Show," curated by Linda L. Cathcart for the Contemporary Arts Center in New Orleans featuring 40 regional Louisiana artists as major traveling exhibition.

== Art practice and career ==
Having resided since 1980 in New Orleans and New York City, Sally Heller's solo exhibitions have taken place in regional centers of Art around the USA. In 1993 she created a permanent relief in the NYC subway system Trains of Thought.

Hanging by a Thread was an ambitious mid-career exhibition presented in 2004 by the Contemporary Arts Center in New Orleans featuring Heller's work from the previous five years. Incorporating a fluidity of sculptural forms, Heller challenged perceptions of feminist, continuity, and mass-production culture.

In 2005 Calamitrees, Heller's exhibition at Montserrat College of Art, Beverly, Massachusetts was a large installation that referred to hurricane Katrina. The same year Trees was installed at the Ritter Art Gallery, Florida Atlantic University.

Heller's 2005 Material Minutiae landscape installation was constructed from detritus ubiquitous to Heller’s artistic practice. She assembles a litany of mundane materials and cultural castoffs into a recognizable yet improbable environments. Richard E. Peeler Art Center, DePauw University, Greencastle, Indiana

Up/Rooted, 2007, an installation at Gallery Bienvenu in New Orleans, is the artist’s statement about the delicate balance between consumerism and a vulnerable environment.

2008–present Scraphouse, New Orleans is a public sculpture funded by the Joan Mitchell Foundation

Lewdicrous, in 2012 was a collaborative feminist installation at Front Gallery in New Orleans

In Orange Alert, a 2016 exhibition at Moore College of Art and Design, Philadelphia Heller used street construction materials to create an installation

In 2016 Second Story, Heller created a second permanent metal site-specific sculpture in a private park in St. Rose, LA similar to Scraphouse and again referencing hurricane Katrina.
