= Carol Schlosberg =

American painter

- Born: June 14, 1957; Newton, Massachusetts
- Died: March 29, 1998 (aged 40); Puerto Escondido, Mexico
- Known for: Painting

Carol Schlosberg (14 June 1957 – 29 March 1998) was an American painter who was born in Newton, Massachusetts, and had been an art instructor at Yale University where she earned her Master of Fine Arts in 1992. She was a resident of Vermont at the time of her death.

During her brief career, she was known for abstract works that have been described as "textured, abstract, sometimes geometric, sometimes free-form." Her career was cut short when she was murdered during a vacation trip to Mexico in 1998.

== Career ==
Schlosberg initially studied painting at Montserrat College of Art in Beverly, Massachusetts, where her teachers included painter George Gabin. In 1989 she received a fellowship to study at the Yale Norfolk Summer School of Music and Art in Norfolk, Connecticut. She subsequently pursued a graduate degree at Yale University, where she studied with William Bailey, Gregory Amenoff, Andrew Forge, Natalie Charkow and Richard Lytle. Schlosberg earned an M.F.A. from Yale in 1992. After her study at Yale, she exhibited throughout the region.

== Death ==
On 29 March 1998, Schlosberg was murdered while vacationing in the resort town of Puerto Escondido, Mexico. Her murder was among the most highly publicized murders of an American in Mexico of its era. The New York Times described the murder as part of a "crime epidemic" then sweeping Mexico. It was the subject of a report on the ABC television news program "20/20" on 27 April 1998.

Two men, one "a Mexican construction worker with a previous conviction for raping a foreign tourist," and the other "a drifter" were convicted of her murder.

After her death, her life and artistic career were recognized by Montserrat College of Art, which named the Carol Schlosberg Gallery in her honor.

== Sources ==
- "Mexicans Convicted of Artsist Death," Associated Press (6 October 1999).
- "The Dangers of Traveling in Mexico," Corporate Travel Safety. (Retrieved 23 May 2012.)
