= Tortilla art =

Fine art that uses tortillas as a canvas

Tortilla art is fine art that uses tortillas as a canvas. The tortilla(s) are baked, often coated with acrylic and painted or screenprinted. The purpose of tortilla art is to reflect the Chicano cultural roots of the artist. Tortilla art is a technique used in many countries. According to one tortilla artist,

"I use the Tortilla as a Canvas because it is an integral part of the Hispanic Culture and my heritage. For the subject matter of my tortilla paintings, I use imagery that is representative of Latinos, conveying their hopes, art, beliefs and history. As the tortilla has given us life, I give it new life by using it as an art medium."

— Joe Bravo

The Great Tortilla Conspiracy is an art group that utilizes tortilla art as a medium. It is located in San Francisco's Mission district and the members include Joseph "Jos" Sances, René Yañez, Rio Yañez, and Art Hazelwood.

Californian artist José Montoya created a series of artworks by burning images onto tortillas.
