= George Gabin =

American painter (1931–2012)

George Gabin (April 16, 1931 – January 7, 2012) was an American artist and art educator.

Born in Brooklyn, New York, Gabin was a prolific painter whose work spanned more than six decades, Gabin's realist paintings and drawings have been described as "atmospheric [and] quasi-surreal." He exhibited nationally, and his work is in more than 100 collections in the United States.

Gabin studied art at the Brooklyn Museum Art School from 1949 to 1954. He also studied at the Art Students League in New York City from 1950 to 1954. His teachers included Reginald Marsh, Ivan Olinsky, and Will Barnet.

From 1963 until 1970, Gabin taught at the New England School of Art and Design, Boston, Massachusetts. In 1970, he and a group of fellow artists, which included Oliver Balf, Joseph Jeswald, Roger Martin, Reno Pisano, Paul Scott, Jim Sweeney and Vincent Varvaro, founded Montserrat School of Visual Art, the forerunner of Montserrat College of Art in Beverly, Massachusetts. Gabin served on the faculty at Montserrat until his retirement in 1998. He was Professor Emeritus at the college until his death in January 2012.

Gabin died in Somerville, Massachusetts, in January 2012.
