= Clint Baclawski =

Artist (born 1981)

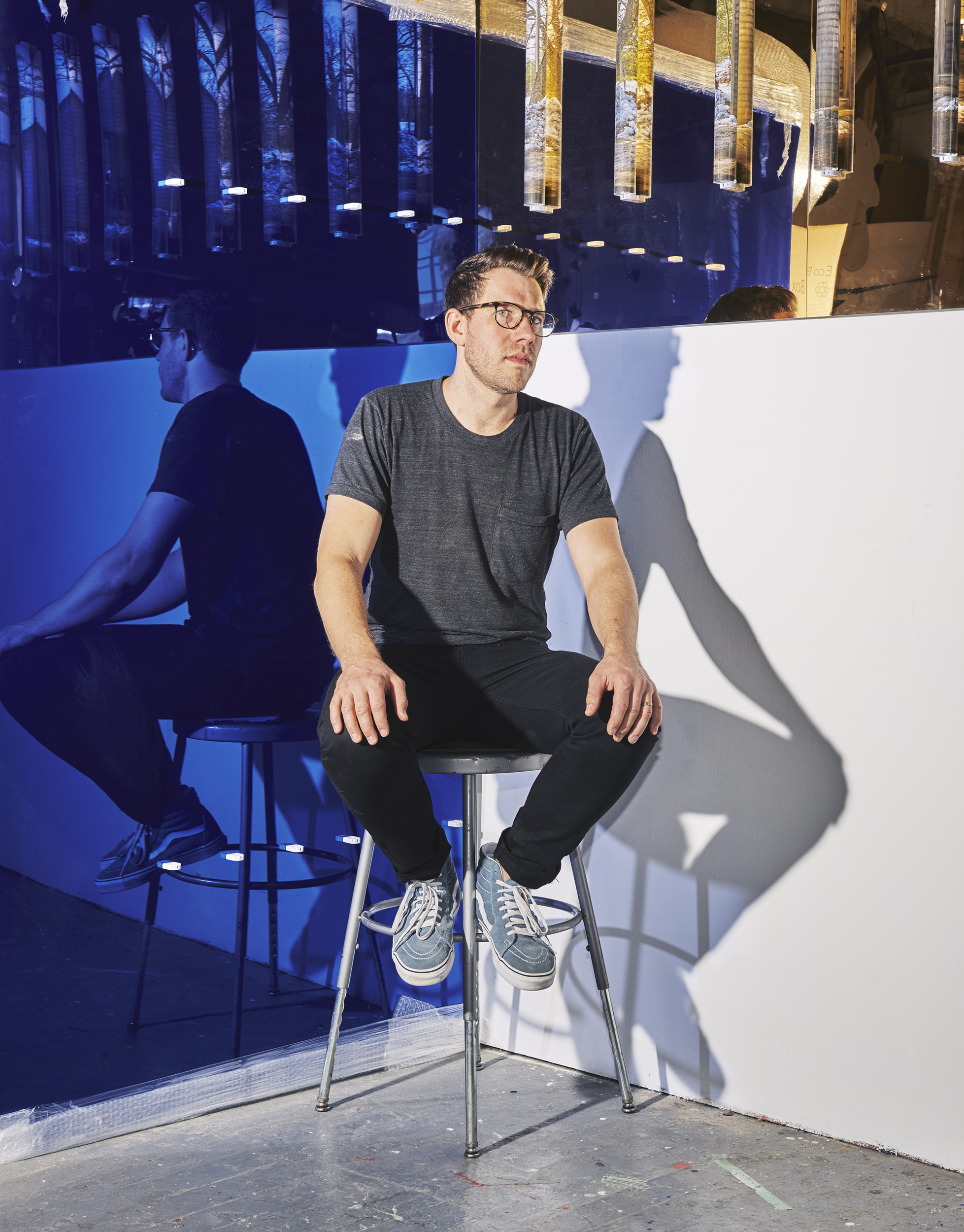
- Born: 1981 (age 44–45)
- Education: Massachusetts College of Art and Design
- Known for: Photography and installation art
- Website: https://www.clintbaclawski.com/

Clint Baclawski (born 1981) is a Boston-based artist who works with photography and light, shooting on an analog camera and transforms the prints into light-filled installation pieces.

== Biography ==
Born in Lewisburg, Pennsylvania, Baclawski attended Rochester Institute of Technology (RIT) for his BFA and Bucknell University for post-baccalaureate study. He then attended Massachusetts College of Art and Design for his MFA.

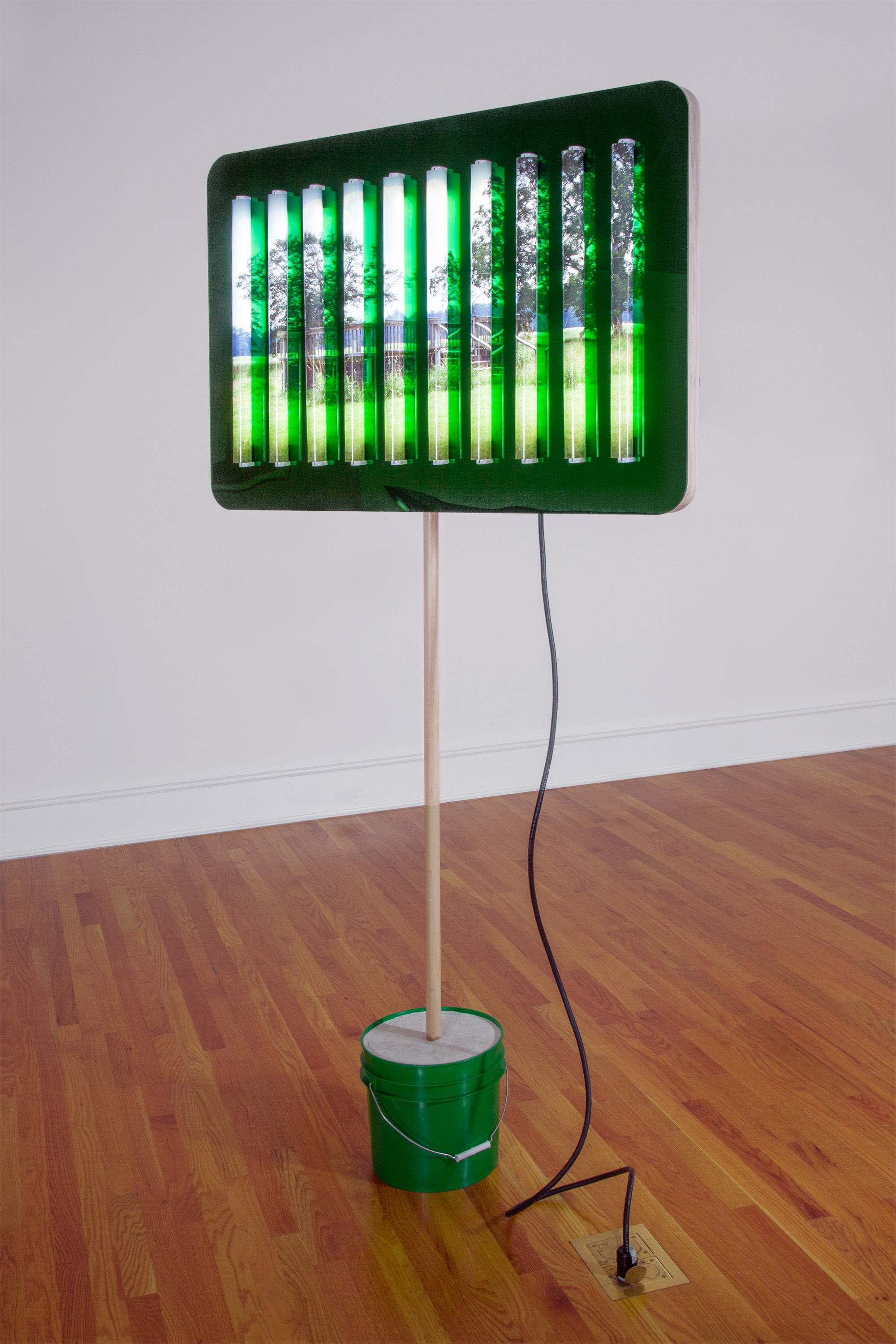
"Greener Pastures," by Clint Baclawski was included in the Castles in the Sky: Fantasy Architecture in Contemporary Art show at Lehman College, New York, NY (2018-2019).

== Style of work ==
Baclawski's installations are film image fragments stuffed inside polycarbonate tubes, which are then placed on mirrored Plexiglas and back-lit by LED lights. The Boston Art Review noted how Baclawski's work connects to his undergraduate degree in advertising photography especially the use of "back-lit imagery" to convey glamour to rural photographs. In 2018, Frame Magazine wrote that he "works with light, imagery, and installation, pushing the boundaries of the traditional photographic frame." Cate McQuaid of the Boston Globe Said of his solo show “Fringe” that "Baclawski models the enchantments and perils of desire. From afar, an object of yearning — a lover, salvation, relief from pain — floods the imagination with its perfections.

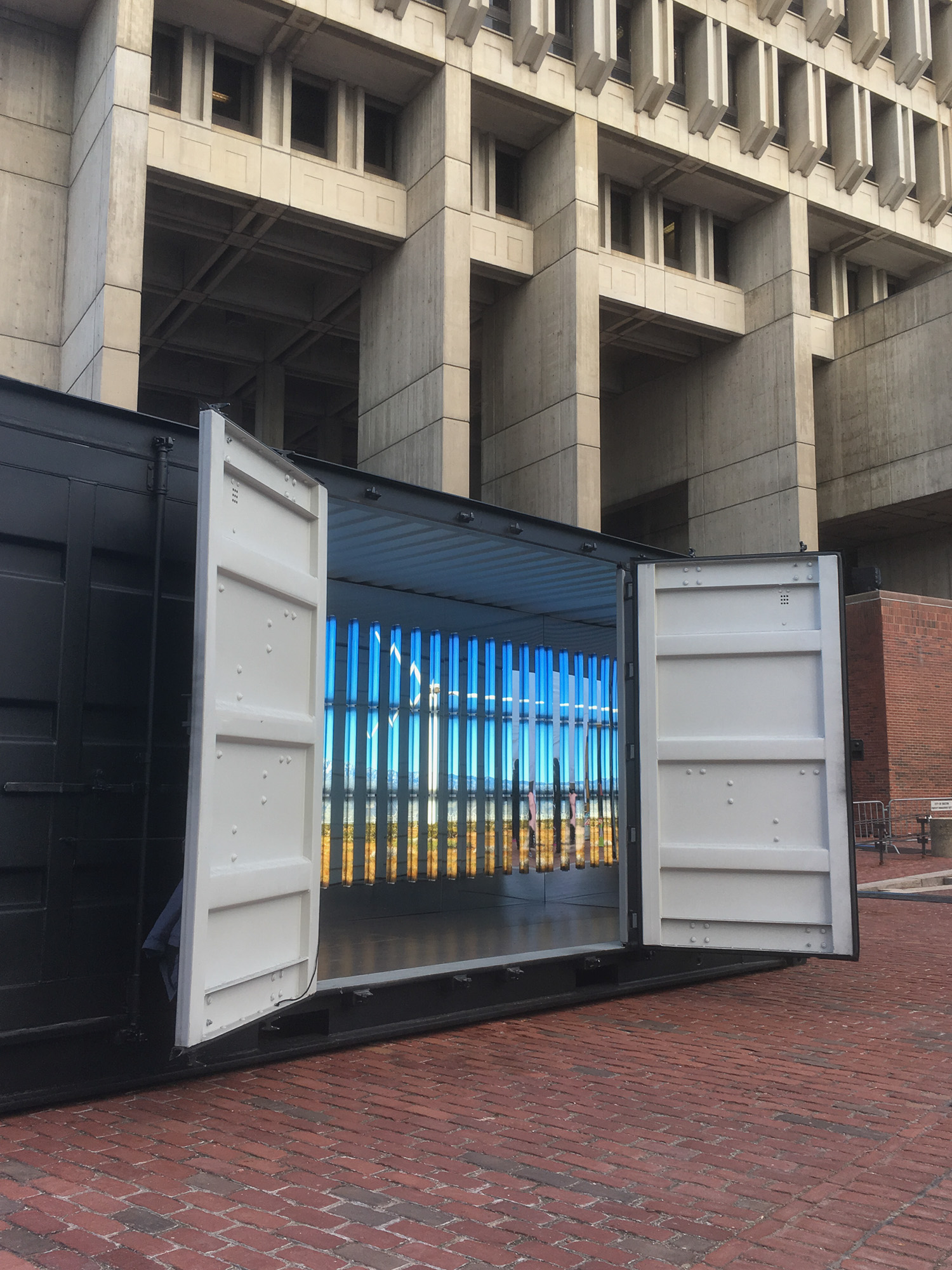
"Zephyr," was included in the 2017 HUBweek Boston.

== Solo exhibitions ==
2014 Chromogenic, The Hallway Gallery, Jamaica Plain, MA

2014 Pink Church, 301 Gallery, Montserrat College of Art, Beverly, MA

2015 Lush, California Polytechnic State University, San Luis Obispo, CA

2015 ACTINIC, Alternative Photography Festival of Scotland, Edinburgh, Scotland

2016 Clint Baclawski: Luminous, Adelson Galleries, Boston, MA

2017 Zephyr, HUBweek Boston, City Hall Plaza, Boston, MA

2019 Fringe, Abigail Ogilvy, Boston, MA
