= Hunter Cole =

American artist and geneticist

- Education: University of Wisconsin-Madison; University of California-Berkeley
- Occupation: Artist
- Website: http://huntercole.art

Hunter Cole is an artist and geneticist. She reinterprets science as art through the creation of living artworks, abstractions, digital art and installations confronting issues related to biotechnology in our culture.

== Early life and education ==
Hunter Cole was known as Hunter O'Reilly until January 2009. She has a bachelor's degree from the University of California-Berkeley and a Ph.D. in Genetics from the University of Wisconsin–Madison.

== Career ==
=== Moon Glow: An Illuminated Living Art Experience exhibitions ===
Moon Glow: An Illuminated Living Art Experience is an expanded version Glow. The exhibit will contain more bioluminescent bacterial drawings. The theme is moons, stars and constellations. The Petri dishes will not only be displayed on the walls but also in globes and panels from the 18 ft. ceiling in a warehouse at Studio 503 in Greensboro, North Carolina on October 22, 2026. After the first exhibition of Moon Glow, there are plans for a statewide and national tour in the United States.

=== Glow: An Illuminated Living Art Experience exhibition ===
Hunter Cole created an installation of living bioluminescent bacteria drawn on 800 Petri dishes that people walked through. The installation included dancers also adorned with bioluminescent bacteria dancing among the visitors. The exhibition was held at the Zeitgeist Multi-Disciplinary Arts Center, Arabi, LA next to New Orleans in October 2019. The exhibition received acclaim in the New Orleans press including the cover of the Sunday edition Living section of The Times-Picayune/Nola.com. Hunter Cole discussed the difficulties of working with a living organism for an art installation in an interview by Mia Cardenas in the SciArt Initiative.

=== Living Light: Photographs by the Light of Bioluminescent Bacteria exhibitions ===
Hunter Cole has created several photographic series that incorporate the medium of bioluminescent bacteria. Entitled, Living Light: Photographs by the Light of Bioluminescent Bacteria, the series include Living Drawings, Bioluminescent Portraits and Installations, Bioluminescent Weddings, and Bioluminescent Nudes, each its own thematic grouping of images which will be shown in a solo exhibition at the ARC Gallery in Chicago in January 2018. The Bioluminescent Nudes series is the most recent starting in 2017. In Living Drawings Cole created drawings with living bioluminescent bacteria and photographed them as they grow and die. Cole has also photographed artists and scientists, wedding photographs, and nudes by the light of bioluminescent bacteria. One of the biological functions of bioluminescence in nature is communication for mating. Cole is recognized among the innovators in the art/science genre, and is one of the first artists to produce significant works using bioluminescent light. Living Light: Photographs by the Light of Bioluminescent Bacteria have been discussed recently in Interalia Magazine, Art the Science, PNAS, Clot Magazine, and MEDinArt. Images of the Living Light series have been shown at several group exhibitions including Cognitive Bias: Visual thinking for a digital age at the Drawing Room, London, England, Fusion: Art Inspired by Science at the Westchester Community College Center For The Arts, White Plains, NY, Head, Shoulders, Genes & Toes at Florida State University Museum of Fine Arts in Tallahassee, Florida, Post Natural at The ISIS Gallery at the University of Notre Dame in conjunction with the Society for Literature, Science and Art Conference in Notre Dame, Indiana, and Vital Signs at New York Hall of Science, Queens New York.

=== Living Drawings exhibitions ===
She is creating a series of Living Drawings with bioluminescent bacteria. These Living Drawings depict the cycle of life and death calling attention to our own mortality. Cole creates controlled line drawings using bioluminescent bacteria. The bacteria then grow in the host environment. Bacteria become collaborators in the art as it grows and dies. First appearing with bright light, bacteria in the drawing are photographed as it uses up available nutrients, gradually dying-off over a two-week period. Cole's Living Drawings have been discussed recently in Interalia Magazine, Art the Science, PNAS,, Clot Magazine, and MEDinArt. The cover of the April 2004 issue of Nature Genetics featured one of these Living Drawings. Cole's Living Drawings have been a part of several group exhibitions such as Cognitive Bias: Visual thinking for a digital age at the Drawing Room in London, UK in 2016, Fusion: Art Inspired by Science at Westchester Community College Center for the Arts in White Plains, NY in 2016, and It's Alive! A Laboratory of BioTech Art, at Montserrat College of Art in Beverly, Massachusetts in 2007. Cole's Living Drawings have had solo shows at the Loyola University Museum of Art in Chicago, Illinois in 2006 and the Honors College at Oakland University in Rochester, Michigan in 2005.

=== Academia ===
Cole is often listed with other artists who create what is often referred to as bioart. Cole has taught both biology and art at University of North Carolina at Greensboro, Loyola University New Orleans, Loyola University Chicago, the Art Institute of Chicago, University of Wisconsin–Milwaukee and University of Wisconsin–Parkside. She joined the faculty at University of North Carolina at Greensboro in Fall 2024. She joined the faculty in the Biology Department at Loyola University Chicago in the Fall 2004. Notedly, in 2001, Cole created a course, Biology through Art, first offered at University of Wisconsin–Parkside, where students have opportunities to create innovative artworks in a biology laboratory. She taught this course at Loyola University Chicago. She adapted the course to an online version at Loyola University New Orleans. She currently teaches a collaborative version at University of North Carolina at Greensboro. Biology through Art helps students from all disciplines to think outside the box. This course focuses on several areas in the biological sciences from molecular biology to human anatomy. Students view microorganisms; use DNA as an artistic medium, create music based on DNA sequence, and see anatomy as art. Contemporary artists that use biological concepts and biological materials in their art are discussed.

Beginning Fall 2008 at Loyola University Chicago, Cole taught a new course she created titled, BioArt: Exploring Living Organisms through Art. The course focuses on art that incorporates living organisms, and also look at art that incorporates actual blood as a medium in the art.

=== Grants and commissions ===
Cole has received grants from the Chicago Community Arts Assistance Program, the Puffin Foundation and the University of Michigan Life Sciences, Values and Society Program to create art for exhibitions reinterpreting science as art looking at positive aspects of biotechnology. In 2006 the National Institutes of Health commissioned her to create paintings based on cancer genomics and cancer proteomics.

=== Genetic Revelations and Radioactive Biohazard exhibitions ===
Cole's exhibition Genetic Revelations was presented at the University of Alabama School of Public Health in Birmingham, Alabama from January to April 2004. Radioactive Biohazard showed the Porter Butts Gallery at the University of Wisconsin–Madison in January/February 2003, [12] at the Warren Robbins Gallery at the University of Michigan in September 2002, and at the Walker's Point Center for the Arts (Milwaukee) in 2001. In the Radioactive Biohazard exhibit, Cole confronts issues related to human cloning, stem cell research, and the human genome project, among others. Cole's art has been shown internationally including New York, San Francisco, England, Italy, Japan and the Czech Republic.

=== Journal covers ===
Cole's art also has been featured on the covers of several scientific journals including Nature Biotechnology (July 2005), Nature Genetics (April 2004), Genetics in Medicine (September/October 2002; November/December 1999), Nature Reviews Genetics (September 2001; August 2001; January 2001), Trends in Ecology and Evolution (June 2001), Developmental Dynamics (September 2000), The EMBO Journal (December 15, 1999); November 2, 1998; (August 3, 1998) and Neural Notes (Winter 1999).

=== Articles ===
Cole co-authored a paper on "Art and Genetics" with Joe Davis, Dana Boyd and Marek Wieczorek published in the Encyclopedia of Life Sciences (ELS). Cole has been the subject of numerous newspaper and magazine articles. Publications that have discussed Cole's work in art and science, among others, include Science, The Scientist, the Chicago Tribune, Detroit Free Press, Muy Interesante in Spain, Le Monde in France and Beaux Arts magazine in France. Additionally, Cole has presented seminars on bioart at the Massachusetts Institute of Technology (MIT) and at the Dialogue Between Science and Art Workshop in Hluboka, Czech Republic.
