= Avenue X station =

New York City Subway station in Brooklyn

Avenue X
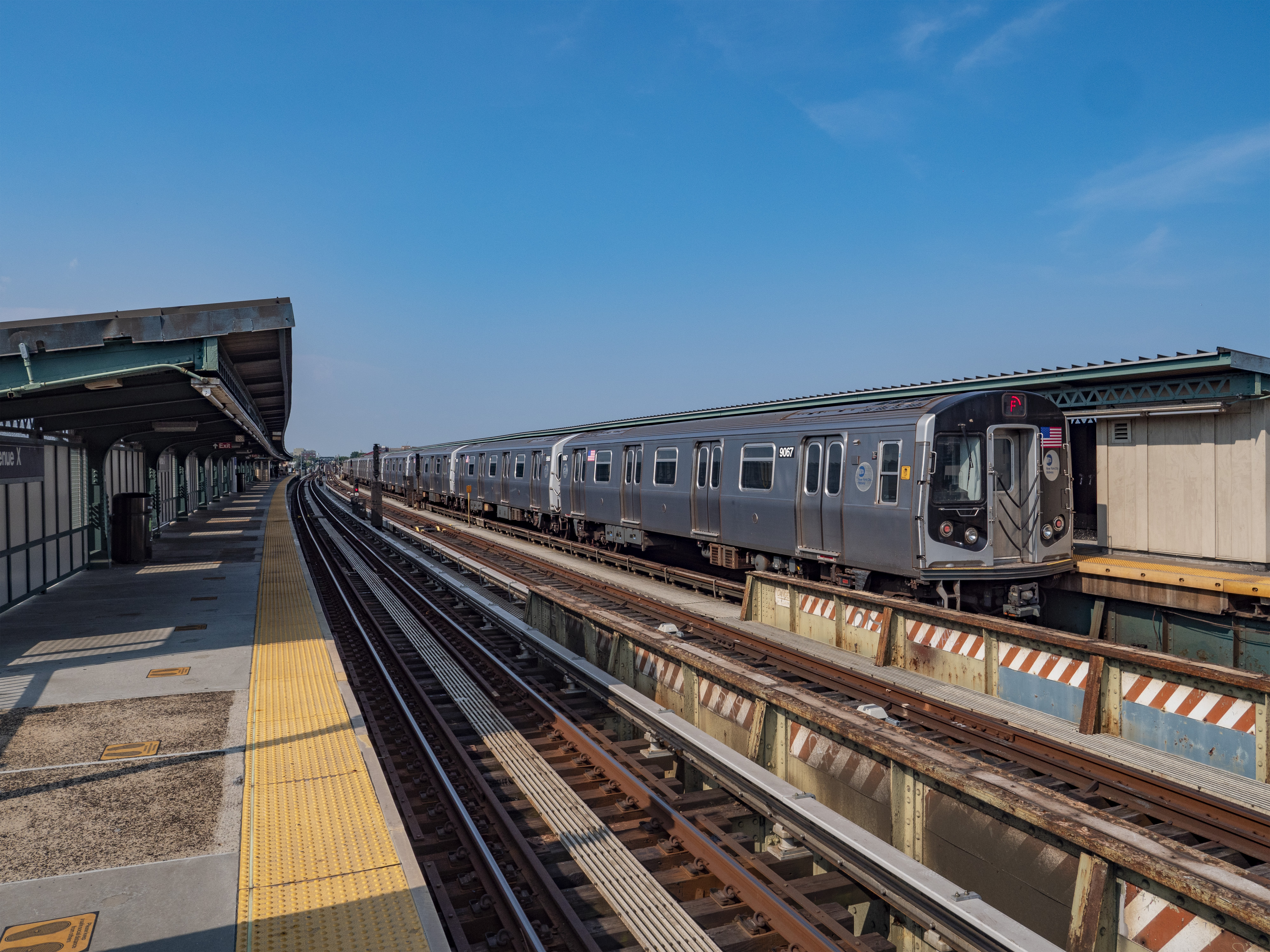
- 179th Street bound F train at the station

Station statistics
- Address: Avenue X, 86th Street & McDonald Avenue; Brooklyn, New York
- Borough: Brooklyn
- Locale: Gravesend
- Coordinates: 40°35′24.51″N 73°58′26.85″W
- Division: B (IND, formerly BMT)
- Line: IND Culver Line; BMT Culver Line (formerly)
- Services: F (all times) <F> (two rush hour trains, peak direction)
- Transit: NYCT Bus: B1, B4
- Structure: Elevated
- Platforms: 2 side platforms
- Tracks: 3 (2 in regular service)

Other information
- Opened: May 10, 1919 (107 years ago)

Traffic
- 2025: 520,692 ▲11.1%
- Rank: 392 out of 423
Services
Preceding station	New York City Subway	Following station
Avenue U F <F> toward Jamaica–179th Street	Local	Neptune Avenue F <F> toward Coney Island–Stillwell Avenue
Non-revenue services and lines
Preceding station	New York City Subway	Following station
Kings Highway express	no service	
Location
Location within New York City Subway
Location within New York City
Location within New York
Track layout
Street map
Station service legend
Symbol	Description
Stops all times	Stops all times
Stops rush hours in the peak direction only (limited service)	Stops rush hours in the peak direction only (limited service)
Stops weekdays and weekday late nights	Stops weekdays and weekday late nights

The Avenue X station is a local station in the Gravesend neighborhood of Brooklyn on the IND Culver Line of the New York City Subway. It is served by the F train at all times and the <F> train during rush hours in the peak direction.

== History ==
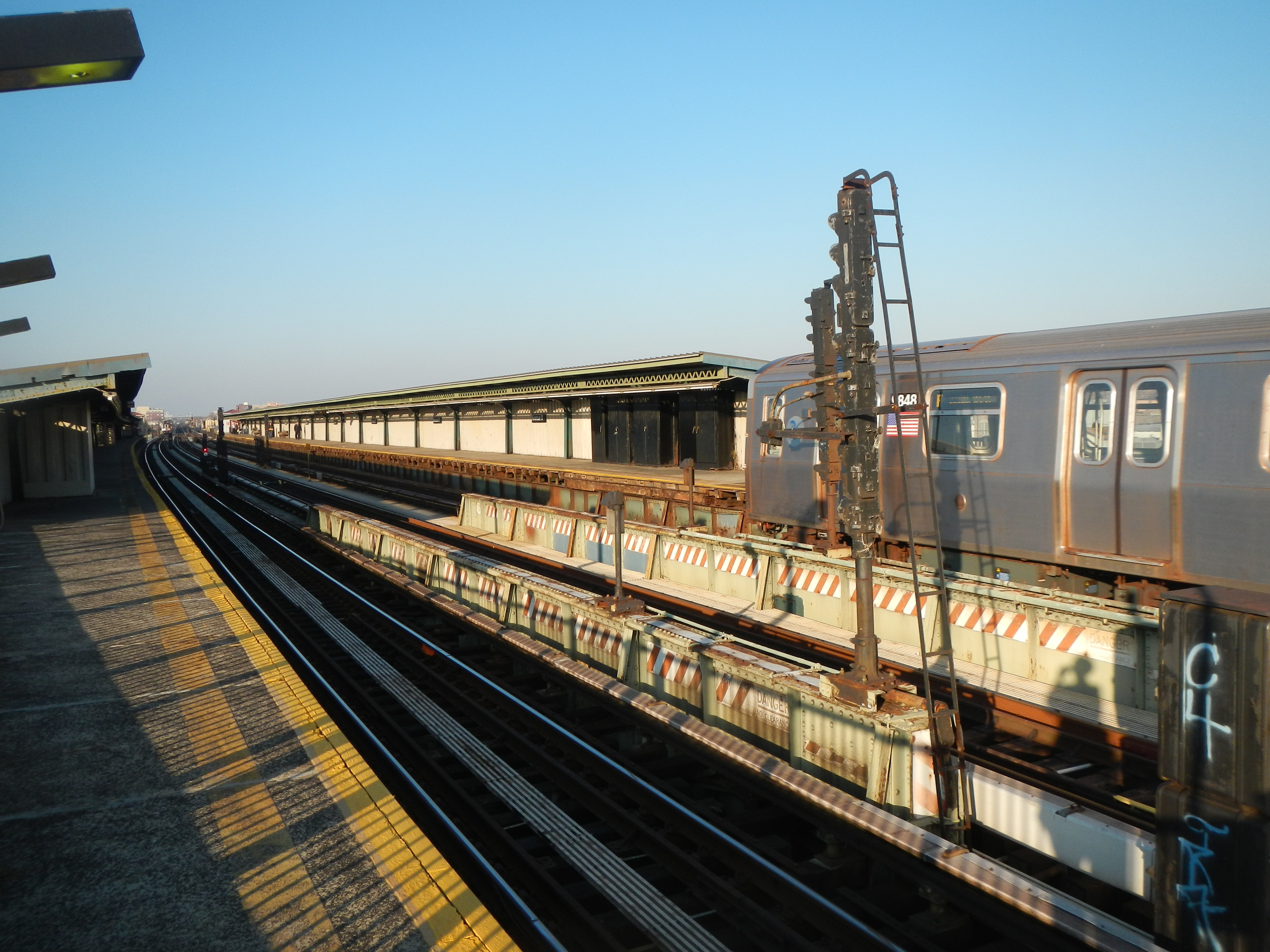
Platforms prior to renovation

As part of Contract 4 of the Dual Contracts, between the city and the BRT, a three-track elevated railway was built above the surface Culver Line from the Fifth Avenue Elevated southeast and south to Coney Island. The Culver Line was operated as a branch of the Fifth Avenue Elevated, with a free transfer at Ninth Avenue to the West End Line into the Fourth Avenue Subway. Avenue X station opened as the line was extended from Kings Highway at noon on May 10, 1919. This station ceased being the line's terminal with the completion of the line to Coney Island on May 1, 1920.

On October 30, 1954, this station began being served by IND D Concourse Express trains operating to Coney Island–Stillwell Avenue as the connection between the IND South Brooklyn Line at Church Avenue and the BMT Culver Line at Ditmas Avenue opened. BMT Culver Line (5) trains were truncated to Ditmas Avenue, the south end of the connection, operating through to Manhattan via the Nassau Street Loop during the day, and terminating at Ninth Avenue at other times. This Culver Shuttle became full-time on May 28, 1959, and was discontinued in 1975.

The station was renovated from June 29, 2015 to December 28, 2015 (Manhattan-bound platform) and June 7, 2016 to May 8, 2017 (Coney Island-bound platform with trains bypassing on the center track) as part of a $140 million renewal project on the Culver Line.

In May 2018, site specific permanent public artwork created by NYC based American artist Derek Lerner was installed at this station. The MTA Arts & Design commissioned art consists of six multi-panel original and unique ink drawings fabricated as laminated glass and installed in platform windscreens.

== Station layout ==
It is the southernmost three-track station on the line, with two side platforms. South of this station, the line is reduced to two tracks as it runs to Coney Island–Stillwell Avenue. Alongside the southbound side of the station is the Coney Island Complex, and there are two tracks that lead to the yard south of this station.

=== Exits ===
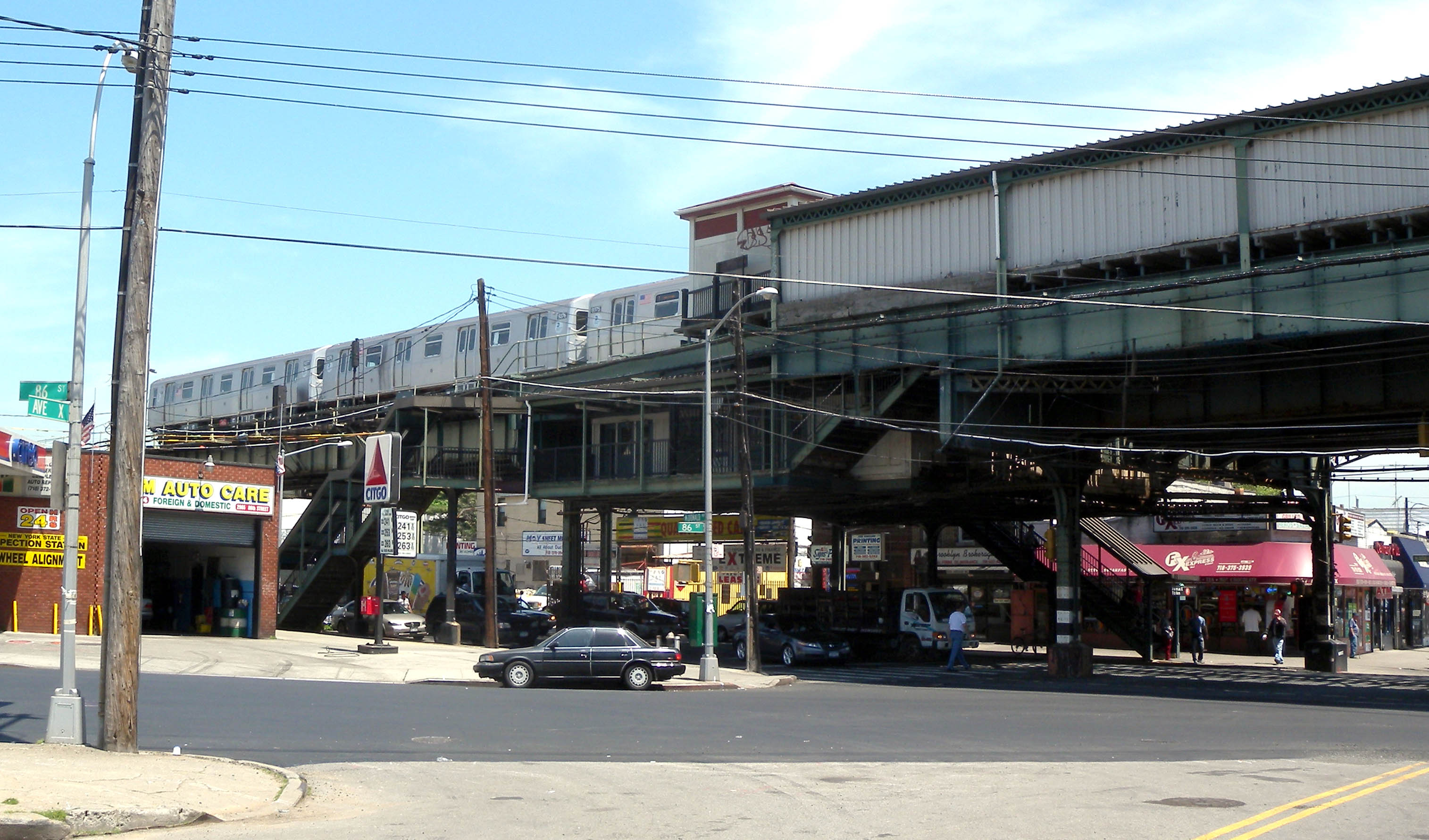
Station view from ground level

The full-time mezzanine at 86th Street and Avenue X has two staircases to the street, and one staircase to each platform. There was a second mezzanine that was abandoned and removed years ago, but little evidence of it remains. The platform stairs are narrower today than they were when the station first opened. The width is more than two feet shorter than normal at the top half of each staircase.

The southbound side has an exit-only staircase at platform level that was used primarily to direct customers to the F shuttle bus to Coney Island–Stillwell Avenue when it was closed for reconstruction from September 2002 to May 2004, and this station was used as a terminal.
