= Elba Rivera =

Artist from El Salvador

- Born: 1947 (age 77–78); El Salvador
- Education: Laney College
- Occupations: Artist, accounting clerk
- Spouse: Brooke Oliver

Elba Rivera (born in 1947) is a Salvadoran-born artist who concentrates on realism, surrealism, and abstract expressionism. Rivera focuses on uncovering subjects related with human's dismissal for nature with surrealist and abstract expressionist techniques. She is best known for her participation in San Francisco community mural art movements and for the art piece, Family Expectations, which depicts an intricate composition of several women whose appearances indicates family union.

== Biography ==
Rivera was born in 1947 in El Salvador and grew up in the Mission District of San Francisco, California. She moved to the Mission District during 1959, and she was one of the painters the Si Se Puede wall painting in Cesar E. Chavez Elementary School, the very elementary school she attended. The Si Se Puede wall mural portrays Cesar Chavez, Dolores Huerta, and farmworker figures and is currently adorning the playground of the elementary school.

Rivera attended Cesar E. Chavez Elementary School in San Francisco for primary education. She attended Laney College as an art major.

During her residence at San Francisco, she married Brooke Oliver, a lawyer who serves on the Latino Community Advisory Board and the Calle 24 Council. Together, they created the Que Viva! Camp at Burning Man. Since then, her produced artwork has been shown in shows such as the DeYoung, Mission Cultural Center for Latino Arts, Precita Eyes, and her public and private exhibitions. She currently works with her wife at 50 Balmy Law, a firm that focuses on providing inventive, lawful solutions and support in workmanship, charitable, copyrights, trademarks, and exposure rights law. On Balmy Alley, one of her murals called Tribute to Mujeres Muralistas, is currently embellished right across from her office.

== Murals ==
San Francisco Mural Movement

Rivera participated in the Mission District community mural movement that highlighted the home, heritage, family, and community of Mexican culture in the San Francisco area. She assisted muralist Susan Cervantes, a 47-year veteran artist who was one of the leaders of the mural movement and joined the Precita Eyes Muralists group, founded by Cervantes and her late husband, and helped paint murals on schools, parks, organizations, private living arrangements, and more. Through collaborative murals, Precita Eyes' murals address issues of class endeavors, prejudice, persecution and celebrate culture, unity, history, and nature.

Murals

- 1994 - Women's Building in San Francisco, California
- 1995 - Keep Our Roots Alive in Cleveland Elementary School in San Francisco, California
- 1995 - Balmy Alley Restorations, Balmy Alley in San Francisco, California
- 1995 - Si Se Puede Mural Restoration, Cesar Chavez Elementary School in San Francisco, California
- 1998 - Hope for the World Cure on backside of the Bagdad Cafe, corner of 16th and Market in San Francisco, California
- 2005 - Tribute to Mujeres Muralistas and Future Generations, Precita Eyes Mural Workshop in San Francisco, California

La Llorona Project

Rivera participated in the La Llorona Project, led by Juana Alicia, that came about in Spring of 2004 at 24th Streets in San Francisco, California. The project took place focusing on women, water, and globalization with financial sponsorship. Juana Alicia wanted to highlight the issues underlying the conflicts of women around the world with the subject being La Llorona, foregrounding the exemplary Mexican legend of the lady who killed her children by drowning them in the river and is cursed to look for them. The blue mural also has other subjects such as women in Bolivia, India, and at the U.S. border. These women are featured in the mural for the challenges that they faced, such as water rights and unsolved homicides of women in Juarez.

The La Llorona mural is located near Juana Alicia's Las Lechugeueras, also known as The Women Lettuce Workers, which portrays farmworkers' rights for better working conditions and pesticide harming in California. The mural was taken down due to the water damage done to the wall with a 90-day warning, and instead, Juana Alicia created the La Llorona mural to take its place.

== Work ==
Family Expectations
This artwork, created in 1993, shows figures of women whose appearances suggest family unification with a traditional and realistic composition. The women are wearing distinctive outfits with a vivid color scheme, representing different generations. The women are not smiling in the artwork except for one woman and her baby that are within a rectangular shape in the artwork. The intent was to emphasize on the freedom of self-prediction and interpretation. The medium of this artwork is oil on canvas, and the canvas size is 3 feet and 2 inches x 2 feet and 6 inches.

Oil Spill

This artwork, created in 1994, is a surrealist painting that features a dying bird symbolizing negligent homicide. The dying bird has a human head. With this artwork, Rivera wanted to expose the brutality to animal life and highlight mankind's apathy towards animals. The dark background highlights the misery of the occasion and makes a sharp differentiation between the winged animal and its natural surroundings. There is also a black swan in the environment that is covered in oil that symbolizes humanity's negligence for animals.

Eye to We

This artwork, created in 1994, is a surrealist painting that portrays an otherworldly presentation that consists of naked structures skipping about underwater. The naked structures have no heads, and they are swimming in the midst of a massive figure that has a single colossal eye. The massive figure with the eye is not peering at the headless naked structures which are swimming around but at the viewers themselves. This artwork mostly consists of overlapping headless naked figures that depict primarily female bodies and the blue water environment harmonizes with the figures. The medium of this artwork is oil on canvas, and the canvas size is 3 feet, 2 1/4 inches × 4 feet.

Oakland Bay Bridge

This artwork, created in 1994, is a colorful display of a well-known landmark. Rivera uses her expressionistic and primitive approach for this artwork to make a dramatic rendition of the landmark. Although the artwork is titled Oakland Bay Bridge, the bridge is not the main subject of the painting. There is a progression of houses strewn across the bay, and there are hillsides in the red landscape. The medium of this artwork is oil on canvas, and the canvas size is 3 feet and 3 inches x 4 feet and 6 inches.

Limbs

This artwork, created in 1993, consists of many dots that are prevalent in her artwork. The background is an ultramarine blue sky, and clouds are concealed behind tree limbs. The atmosphere is full of clouds while the tree limbs overlap them. The limbs are in the form of human arms and legs, and the limbs seem to be grabbing upward as though trying to uncover one's presence.

The Matador

This artwork, created in 1992, depicts a matador with a red cape. There are folds and wrinkles of the matador's red cape, and its composition highlights them. There is also another matador on the right side. The medium of the artwork is oil on canvas, and the size of the canvas is 5 feet x 4 feet.

== Bibliography ==
- Ancona, George. Barrio: Josés Neighborhood. Harcourt Brace, 1998.
- Cordova, Cary. The Heart Of The Mission. University Of Pennsylvania Press, Inc., 2017.
- “Featured Artists.” The Mission, missionbooksf.com/featured-artists.
- Jacoby, Annice. Street Art San Francisco: Mission Muralismo. New York: Abrams, 2009. Print.
- Lee, Anthony W. Painting On The Left. University Of California Press, 1999.
- McConnell, Doug, and Jerry Emory. Bay Area Backroads. London, 1999.
