= Roberto Vargas (poet) =

Nicaraguan poet and political activist

Roberto Vargas (born February 24, 1941) is a Nicaraguan poet and political activist. He was born in Managua, Nicaragua and raised in the Mission District, San Francisco, where he became a prominent political activist. From 1974 through 1979, he taught Creative Writing at San Francisco State University.

He is best known for his work in the San Francisco Mission district during the Nicaraguan Revolution and bilingual poetry.

== Early life ==
He graduated from Mission High School in 1958. "I graduated from Mission High School in 1958 and used to hang out in North Beach, going around to see all the poets," he says. Vargas attempted to have a career in boxing, but that ended quickly because of a detached retina that helped him during the major drafts of young men to fight in Vietnam.

== Political Activity and work in The Mission ==
Vargas was an organizer at San Francisco State University during the widespread student strikes in 1968–1969. He was one of the community activists who organized alongside students to demand that the university establish an Ethnic Studies Department. He did this as part of larger efforts to make public institutions more accountable and accessible to San Francisco's communities of color and low-income people. This effort by a diverse coalition of students, activists and faculty resulted in the nation's first School of Ethnic Studies, at San Francisco State University. Having been an active organizer in the arts and poetry scene of San Francisco—including making connections between the "Beat" poets of North Beach and the burgeoning Latin American arts scene in San Francisco's Mission District—Vargas became a creative writing lecturer for the La Raza Studies program of the new Ethnic Studies Department.

Roberto Vargas was among many Nicaraguans who mobilized in San Francisco to form the Comité Cívico Nicaraguense (Nicaraguan Civic Committee) following the 6.2 magnitude 1972 Nicaragua earthquake. The committee set up donation centers in the San Francisco Mission to benefit those affected in the earthquake, however the ruling Nicaraguan party headed by Anastasio Somoza Debayle was criticized for not distributing the aid received.

Vargas and other poets, Alejandro Murguia, joined force with the Pocho-Che Collective and published local poets within the Latino Community. Many of these poems were related to the famous communist icon, Che Guevara. For these future famous poets, Che was an important connection to the Third World countries and the barrios in the United States.

Among the tools used by the Nicaraguan Civic Committee to help liberate Nicaragua from Somoza were the recruitment of local and international Latino artists to add an extra artistic element to the political movement. This helped inform the community of the realities of Central American poverty and oppression.

Notable artists who collaborated with the committee were Nicaraguan poet Ernesto Cardenal and artist Juan Flores.

Vargas decided that the political action taking place in San Francisco was not enough, so he and other Nicaraguans joined the armed struggle in Nicaragua. To prepare, Vargas trained in martial arts and learned to fly small planes through their hourly rental at an aviation facility in San Francisco. Once in Nicaragua, Vargas fought for a year, during which time he would frequently visit family in San Francisco.

In 1974, Vargas cofounded the Gaceta Sandinista, a San Francisco Spanish-language newspaper dedicated to covering the struggle in Nicaragua. The creation of this newspaper helped further his wishes of bringing the revolution to both countries.

Vargas became involved with El Tecolote, a bilingual newspaper headquartered in San Francisco. And in 1975 wrote,

Every Latino has the responsibility to work toward the liberation of our people. There is no neutral or middle ground, and we must join the struggle

== Personal life ==
On his 70th birthday, a huge celebration for Roberto Vargas was performed in the street of the Mission. A poetry event in the Mission Cultural Center was held to honor him for his dedication movement in the 1970s. During this event, a special clip was shown of the Roberto taking over the Nicaraguan consulate in San Francisco. He had three children Roberto Ariel Vargas, Michelle Vargas and Rigoberto Enrique Vargas.

== Credentials ==
- Neighborhood Arts Program Organizer, San Francisco Arts Commission (1969-7194).
- Translator and facilitator for Poet Ernesto Cardenal (1974–present).
- Associate Director, San Francisco Art Commission, Neighborhood Arts Program. (1974–1979).
- Creative Writing instructor, San Francisco State University (1970–1973).

=== Diplomat ===
- Attache, Cultural and Labor Affairs, Embassy of Nicaragua, Washington, DC (1979–1986)
- Deputy Director of North American Affairs, Foreign Ministry of Nicaragua.
- Nicaragua's Ambassador to China, Beijing (1990).
- Consultant for Social and cultural Programs, CITGO Petroleum of Venezuela (2006–2009)
- Field Representative, American Federation of Teachers (2009–present)

== Awards ==
Vargas has been the recipient of numerous awards and honors including:

- Life Time Achievement, University of Massachusetts Amherst. December 2005
- Honorary Chairman, San Francisco Arts Commission. May 2008
- Certificate of Honor, San Francisco Board of Supervisors. May 2008
