= Vanessa Platacis =

American contemporary artist (born 1973)

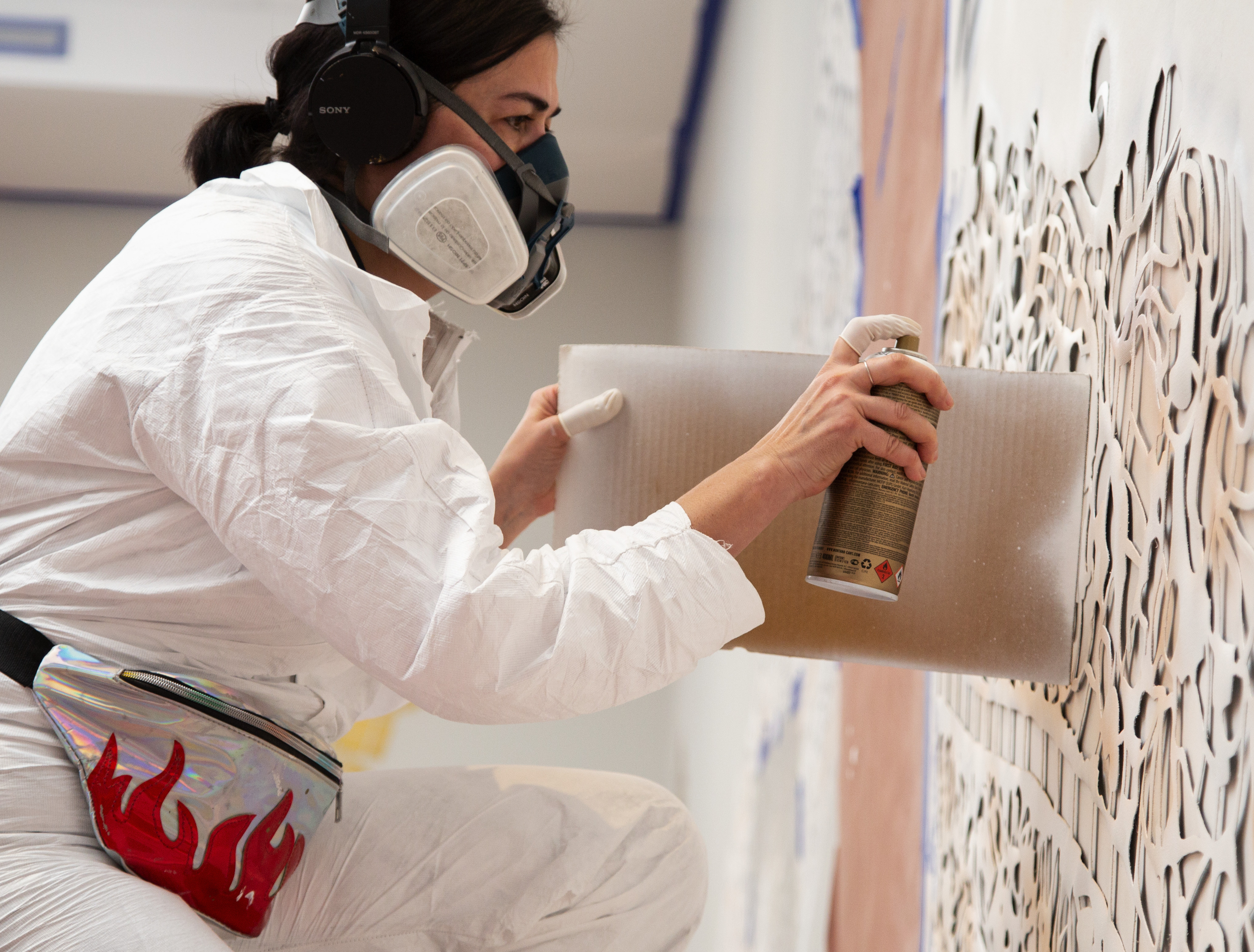
- Born: 1973 (age 52–53)
- Notable work: PIXNIT, L’ E’tat, C’test Moi, 4 Pleasant Street: A Retrospective, ¡NO!, Taking Place

Vanessa Platacis (born 1973) is an American contemporary artist, known for her large scale painting installations and her paintings and performance art. Platacis hand draws and cuts stencils that are used to paint directly onto walls using a variety of spray paint and graffiti techniques. Her work has been featured in galleries and private collections in Boston, Cambridge, Los Angeles, Miami, New Mexico, and France as well as the SCOPE Art Show in Basel, Switzerland. Currently, she lives and works on an island off the coast of Savannah, GA and teaches painting at the Savannah College of Art and Design.

== Biography ==
Platacis is an American and received an M.F.A. in studio art from the School of the Museum of Fine Arts at Tufts, Boston, MA and a B.F.A. in painting from New Mexico State University, Las Cruces, NM.

== Career and work ==
Platacis’ early work from 2005-2010 introduced pattern and decoration into her street art, being strongly influenced by the Pattern and Decoration movement. Her installations are site-specific and are designed to exist only in the space for which they were created so the viewer can engage and interact with the public spaces in new ways.

Platacis' first museum exhibition was in 2008 at the DeCordova Museum and Sculpture Park in Lincoln, MA and a 10 year retrospective of her work titled 4 Pleasant Street: A Retrospective was on view in Cambridge, MA. She has been a guest speaker at the Institute of Contemporary Art, Boston and numerous universities along the east coast and has been a contributing writer to ARTPULSE Magazine.

Platacis’ 2,700 square-foot permanent painting installation Taking Place opened in September, 2019 at the Peabody Essex Museum in Salem, MA.

=== PIXNIT, 2005-2010 ===
Platacis worked under the pseudonym PIXNIT, The pseudonym is based on the Latin phrase pinxit, meaning "he/she painted this work," which often accompanied artist signatures on European Late Medieval and Renaissance paintings. In 2007 The Boston Globe ran a feature story about her artwork. Her painting style, combining graffiti with a distinctive stenciling technique, was guerilla art designed to simultaneously beautify and to critique the uses and misuses of the urban environment.

Art critics championed PIXNIT’s work and it was also greatly admired by more wide-ranging viewers. In 2008 she was voted The Best of Boston Graffiti/Street/Performance Artist. Her fans used the catchphrase “That’s so PIXNIT” in reference to a decorative element added to any surface. Platacis ended this body of work by releasing an obituary for PIXNIT claiming that “she was missing and was presumed dead in the spring of 2010 - last seen April 2nd when filmed by a CCTV camera near Pont Alexandre in Paris, France.” Platacis won the New England Art Award for Performance Art in 2010.

=== L’ E’tat, C’test Moi, 2007 ===
In conjunction with the first SCOPE Art Fair in Basel, Switzerland in 2007, PIXNIT created a large-scale (12' x 30') painting installation, designed to challenge assumptions about graffiti in the urban environment. Using a combination of hand-cut stencils and vinyl, the installation critiqued accepted histories relating to beauty and taste.

=== 4 Pleasant Street: A Retrospective, 2017-2020 ===
Co-organized by the Cambridge Arts Council and curator Geoff Hargadon, 4 Pleasant Street: A Retrospective is the first full-scale retrospective of work by Platacis. The 16' x 40' installation included dozens of her most recognizable paintings from her body of work as PIXNIT. The work brings together multi-cultural patterns and a monochromatic color palette to reflect Platacis’ contribution to the history of street art, painting and performance in Boston, Massachusetts.

=== ¡NO!, 2017 ===
On January 21, 2017, Platacis attended the 2017 Women's March in Washington D.C., the largest protest in U.S. history. Her performance work during the event, titled "¡NO!" was protest art and led to one of the iconic visual images of the march in addition to being published in dozens of books and magazines including The New York Times and Rolling Stone. The marchers that attended that day went on to win the prestigious PEN/Toni and James C. Goodale Freedom of Expression Courage Award. For Platacis, the performance used public space to address socio-political issues and to bring attention to policies regarding human rights, including women's rights, immigration reform, healthcare reform, reproductive rights, the environment, LGBTQ rights, racial equality, freedom of religion and workers' rights.

=== Taking Place, 2019 ===
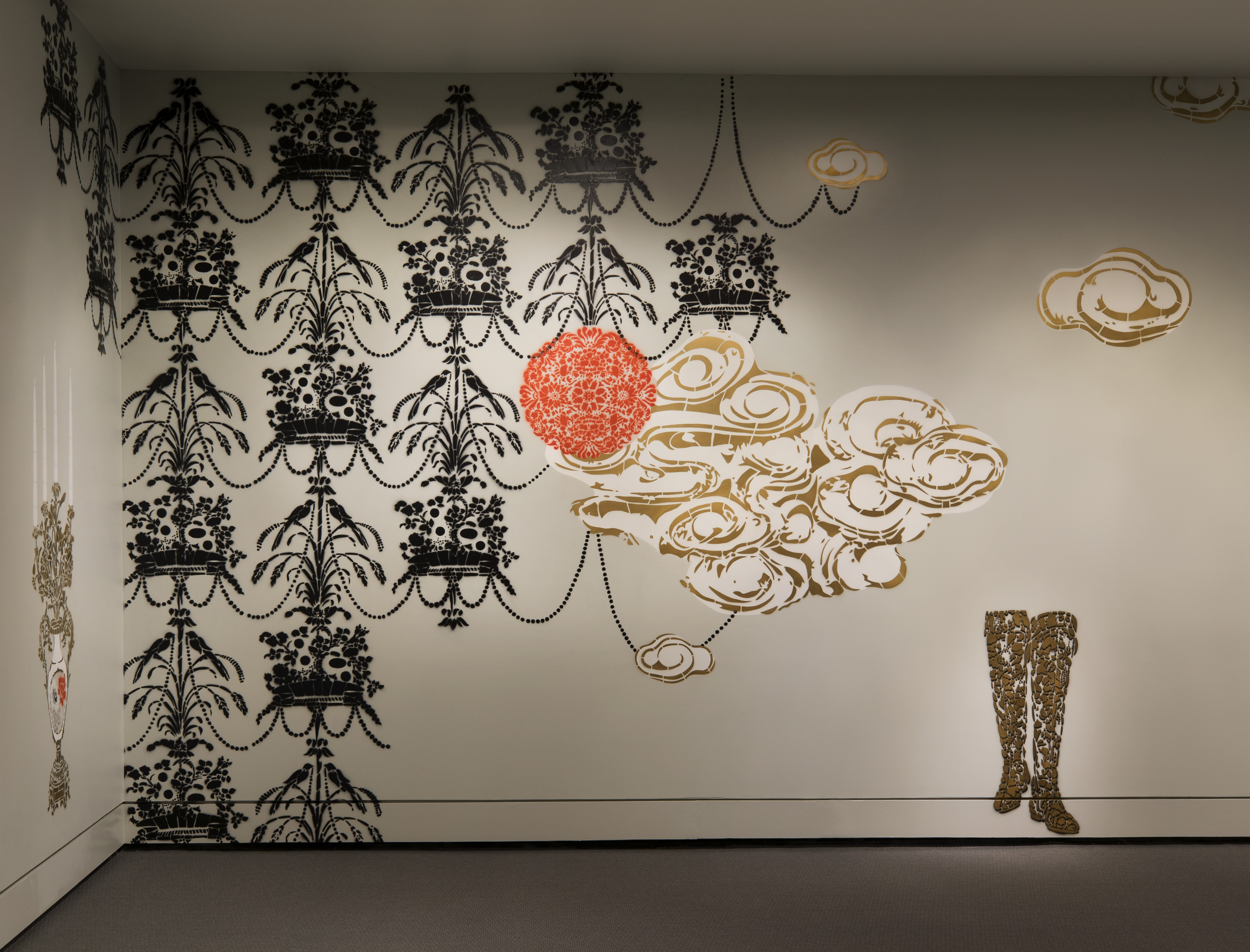
Taking Place. © Peabody Essex Museum. Photography by Bob Packert

Taking Place is a 2,700 sq. ft. painting installation that reimagines some of the Peabody Essex Museum's most beloved objects from their global collections. Platacis' research-based art practice resulted in 210 stencils, all drawn and cut by hand. Organic forms and curvilinear lines emerge as dominant elements across generations and cultures as her labor-intensive contemporary approach to painting connects to the skill and artistry embedded within the historic objects of PEM's collection. The exhibition opened September 2019 and all 210 stencils have been acquired by PEM for the museum's permanent collection.

== Awards ==
- The PEN/Toni and James C. Goodale Freedom of Expression Courage Award (United States, 2017)
- New England Art Award, Performance Artist (United States, 2010)
- The Phoenix: Best of Boston Award, Graffiti/Street/Performance Artist (United States, 2008)

== Publications ==
- Impact of Mooninites on Public Art: Theater of the Absurd
- ARTPULSE Magazine. “Look Here, Go There: An interview with Taylor Davis.” No. 22 Vol. 6, 2015.
- ARTPULSE Magazine. “Taylor Davis.” Review. No. 20 Vol. 5, 2014.
