= Evelyn Carmen Ramos =

American art historian and curator

- Education: New York University; University of Chicago
- Occupations: Art historian, curator, museum professional
- Employers: National Gallery of Art (2021–); Smithsonian American Art Museum (2010–2021); The Newark Museum of Art

Evelyn Carmen Ramos (also referred to as E. Carmen Ramos) is the first woman and the first person of color to be the chief curatorial and conservation officer at the National Gallery of Art.

== Education ==
Ramos received a bachelor's degree in Art History and Psychology from New York University in 1988. In 1995, she went on to earn a Master's in art history from the University of Chicago. In 2011, she earned her PhD in art history also from the University of Chicago.

== Career ==
=== Internships ===
Ramos held internships at Art Institute of Chicago, Brooklyn Museum, Metropolitan Museum of Art, and was a fellow in the Smithsonian Latino Museum Studies Program. Ramos was a public programs educator at the Brooklyn Museum. She later worked at the Newark Museum of Art in New Jersey as an assistant curator.

=== Smithsonian ===
Ramos joined the Smithsonian American Art Museum (SAAM) as the acting chief curator and curator of Latino art in 2010 until her departure in 2021. At SAAM, she organized several different exhibits, including “Our America: The Latino Presence in American Art” in 2013, “Down These Mean Streets: Community and Place in Urban Photography” in 2017, “Tamayo: The New York Years" in 2017-18, and “¡Printing the Revolution! The Rise and Impact of Chicano Graphics, 1965 to Now” in 2021. During her time at SAAM, Ramos has doubled the Latino collections.

=== The National Gallery of Art ===
Ramos was appointed as chief curatorial and conservation officer at the National Gallery of Art on May 13, 2021. Ramos is the first woman and the first person of color to be the chief curatorial and conservation officer at the National Gallery of Art.
