= Unique Photo =

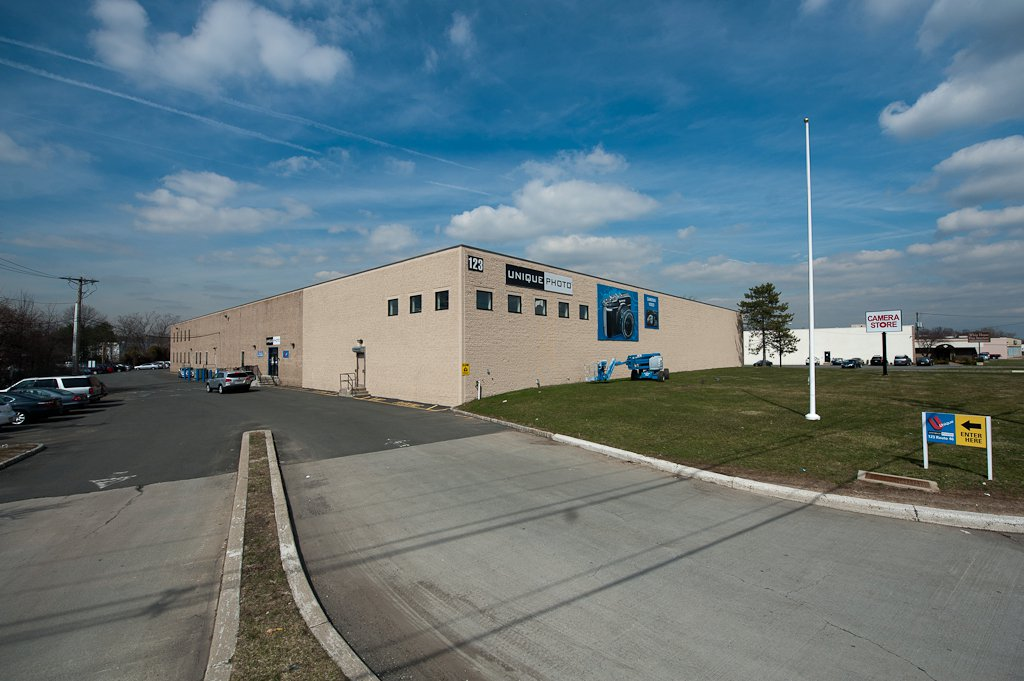
- The Unique Photo Superstore, Fairfield, New Jersey location.
- Type: Private company
- Industry: Photography; Retail; Education
- Founded: 1947 (79 years ago)
- Founder: Bernard and Harriet Sweetwood
- Headquarters: Fairfield, New Jersey and Philadelphia, PA, United States
- Number of locations: 2
- Area served: United States
- Key people: Alexander Sweetwood (President); Jack Sweetwood; Jonathan Sweetwood; Zak Sweetwood
- Products: Cameras; Film; Lighting; Printing & Scanning; Audio & Video; Mobile & Electronics
- Number of employees: 51-200
- Website: https://www.uniquephoto.com/

Unique Photo is a camera, video, and audio store and education center. It is a family-owned business that opened in 1947. Unique Photos has locations in Fairfield, New Jersey and Philadelphia, Pennsylvania.

== History ==
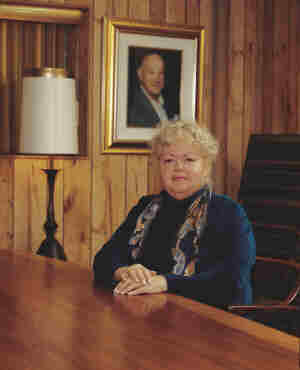
Harriet Sweetwood, co-founder of Unique Photo.

Bernard and Harriet Sweetwood started the company in 1947 when they opened a small photographic supply outlet in Brooklyn. They proceeded to open over 20 retail outlets in department stores across New Jersey and then the Hoboken Camera Center in the 1954. In the 1980s, their two sons, Jonathan and Matthew Sweetwood took over daily operations.

In 2008, Unique Photo moved its Florham Park, New Jersey location to Fairfield, New Jersey. It is a 50,000 square foot facility equipped with a multimedia classroom, rental equipment center, and photo lab. On March 30, 2009, Unique Photo announced that it had received the very last shipment of Polaroid film ever made.

In October 2015, Alexander Sweetwood was named president of Unique Photo. In 2019, Unique Photo opened their second location in Old City, Philadelphia with classrooms and studio rental space.

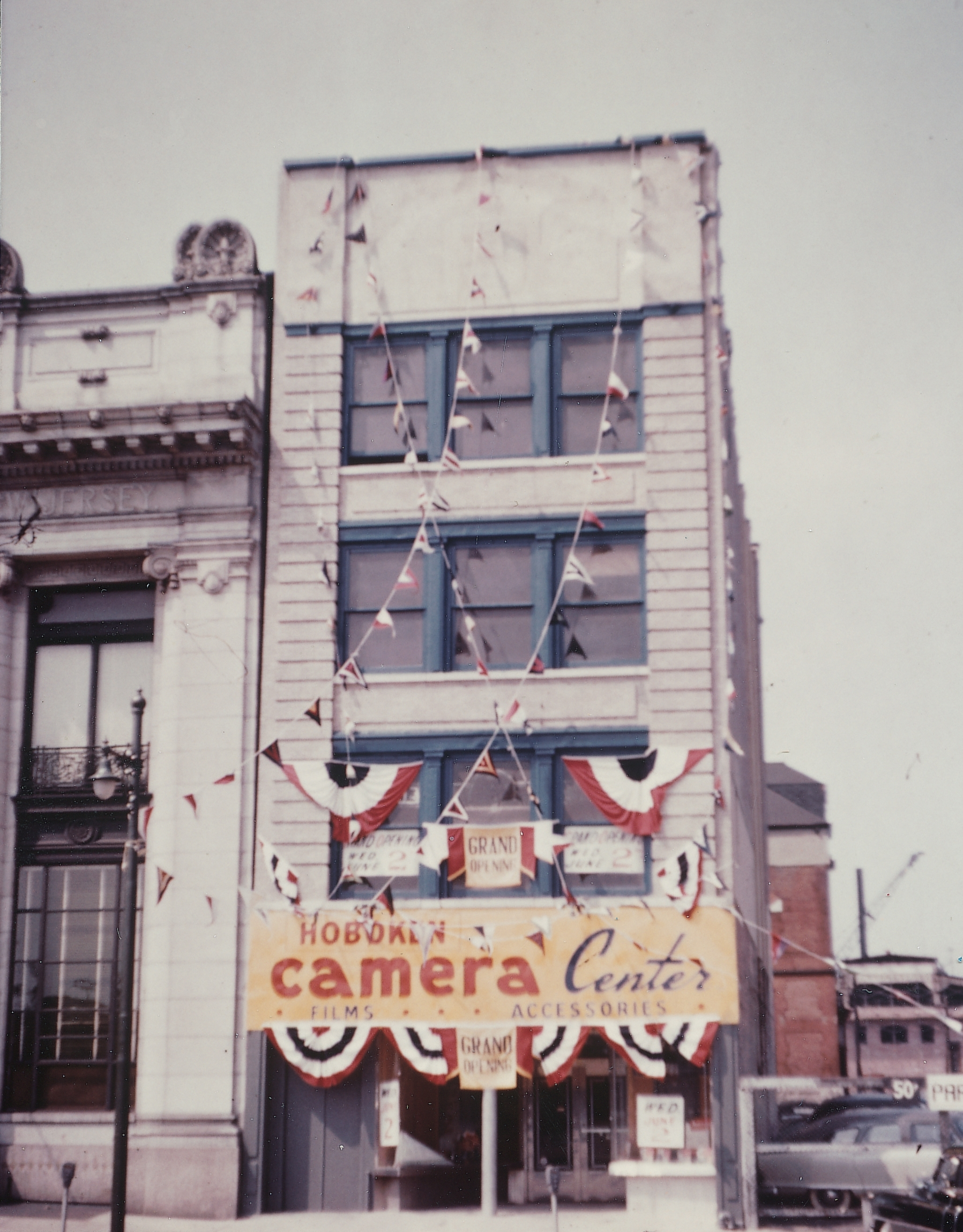
Unique Photo was known as the Hoboken Camera Store in Hoboken, New Jersey in the 1950s.

== Unique University ==
Unique Photo runs a photography education program called Unique University that offers seminars and classes from beginner to expert. Unique University's technical classes include basic D-SLR photography, D-SLR video, lighting techniques, Adobe Photoshop, Elements and Lightroom, composition, editing and printing, wedding photography, HDR photography, and working with speedlites.

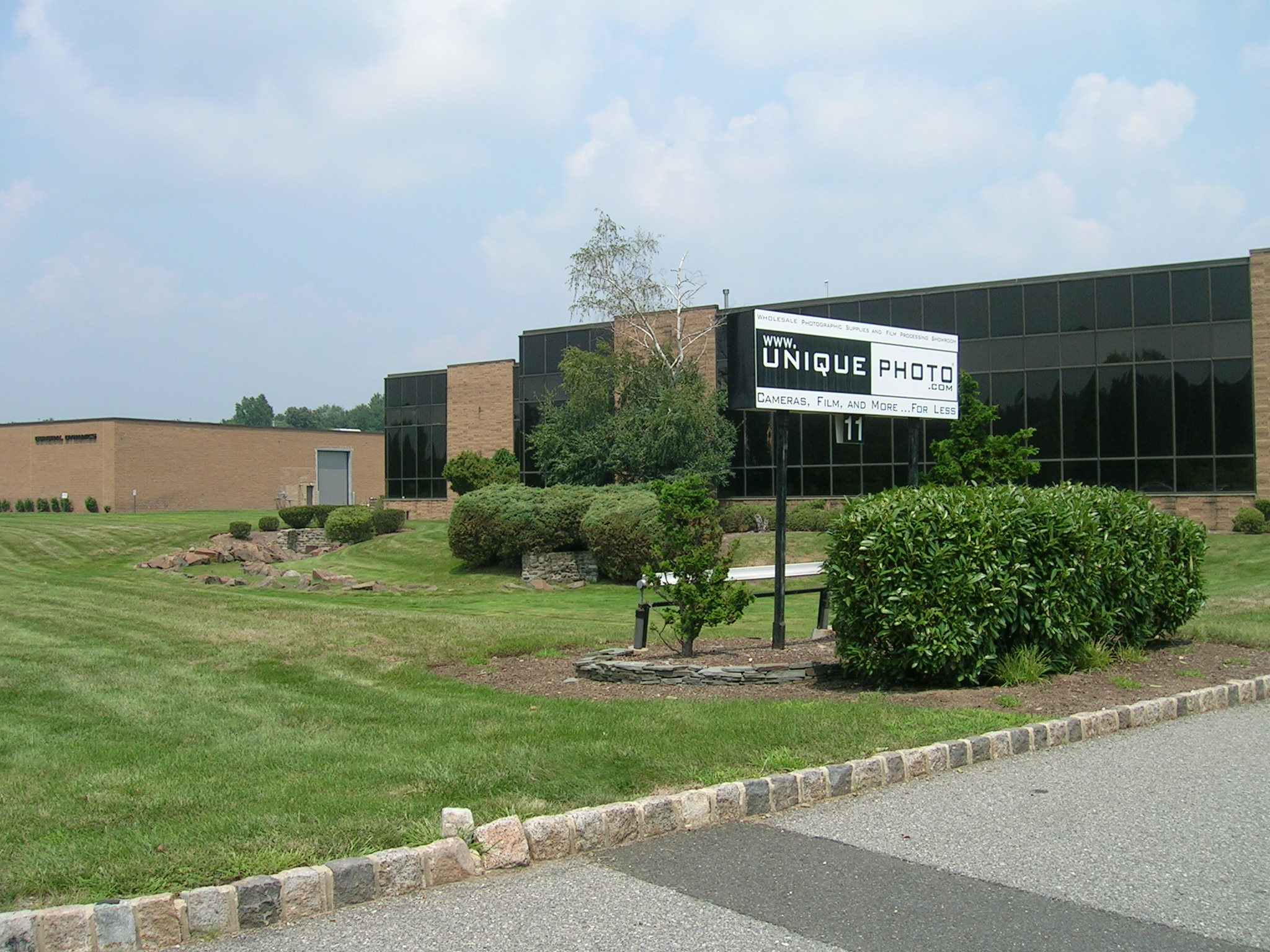
Unique Photo's 1997-2007 location.

== Recognition ==
Unique Photo was awarded "2013 Dealer of the Year" by Digital Imaging Reporter.

In November of 2018, Unique Photo was named a finalist in the 2018 Family Business of the Year by the Rothman Institute of Entrepreneurship at Fairleigh Dickinson University.

== Lawsuits ==
Argued October 31, 1966. Decided January 23, 1967. -- Hoboken Camera Center, Inc. v. Hartford Accident & Indemnity Co., 93 N.J. Super. 484, 484 (N.J. Super. Ct. App. Div. 1967)

On September 17, 2013, Unique Photo filed a lawsuit on Unique Photo Deals USA, LLC because Unique Photo Deals USA had agreed to cease using the similar name in February 2013, including operating on Amazon and surrendering UniquePhotoDealsUSA.com to Unique Photo, Inc., but continued using the name elsewhere.
