= Oliver Lee Jackson =

African American artist (born 1935)

- Born: 1935 (age 90–91); St. Louis, Missouri, U.S.
- Other names: Oliver Jackson, Oliver L. Jackson
- Education: Illinois Wesleyan University, University of Iowa
- Occupations: Painter, sculptor, draftsman, printmaker, educator
- Website: www.oliverleejackson.com

Oliver Lee Jackson (born 1935) is an American painter, sculptor, draftsman, printmaker, and educator. His art studio is in Oakland, California. He was a professor at the California State University, Sacramento from 1971 until 2002, and developed a curriculum for the Pan African Studies program at the school.

== Early life and education ==
He was born in 1935 in St. Louis, Missouri, into an African American family. After graduating from Vashon High School, Jackson attended Illinois Wesleyan University (B.F.A. 1958). He served in the United States Army and was honorably discharged in 1961. He attended the University of Iowa (M.F.A. 1963).

== Teaching ==
In the 1960s, he taught art classes at St. Louis local universities and colleges and remained active in this local community. He was director of program Uhuru at Pruitt and Igoe public housing in St. Louis in 1967 and 1968, a program to bring the low-income African American community a constructive means of developing dialogue through arts programs.

He taught at St. Louis Community College (1964 to 1967); Southern Illinois University (1967 to 1969); Washington University in St. Louis (1967 to 1969); and Oberlin College (1969 to 1970). In 1971, he moved to California and joined the faculty at California State University, Sacramento, where he remained until 2002.

== Art career ==
Jackson was affiliated with the multidisciplinary arts collective Black Artists Group (BAG) in St. Louis through his close friendship with BAG co-founder Julius Hemphill, though he was not an official BAG member. BAG was founded by musicians, theater artists, dancers and visual artists as a support structure for creative expression among African American artists, and in order to have a greater place in the cultural landscape.

Jackson's paintings are based in figural and gestural forms, and often expressionist in nature. There are a mixture of cultural references and iconography in his paintings including references to historical African art and European Modernism. Photographs of the Sharpeville massacre in March 1960 in South Africa became an inspiration for Jackson in the development of his figurative gestural forms, and resulted in his Sharpeville Series (1968–1977).

Jackson's works are in the museum collections of the Museum of Modern Art; the Metropolitan Museum of Art; the Studio Museum in Harlem; the National Gallery of Art; San Francisco Museum of Modern Art; San Jose Museum of Art; the Seattle Art Museum; and many other public collections.

== Exhibitions ==
=== Solo ===
- 1979 – Oliver Jackson, Bixby Gallery, Washington University in St. Louis, Missouri
- 1982 – Oliver Lee Jackson, Seattle Art Museum, Seattle, Washington
- 1983 – Oliver Lee Jackson, Matrix Gallery, UC Berkeley Art Museum, Berkeley, California
- 1990 – Currents 43: Oliver Jackson, Crocker Art Museum, Sacramento, California
- 1993 — New California Art: Oliver Jackson, Newport Harbor Art Museum, Newport Beach, California
- 1993 – Oliver Jackson: Works on Paper, Crocker Art Museum, Sacramento, California
- 2002 — Duo, Sert Gallery, Carpenter Center for the Arts, Harvard University, Cambridge, Massachusetts
- 2017 – Oliver Lee Jackson: Composed, San Jose Institute of Contemporary Art, San Jose, California
- 2019 – Oliver Lee Jackson: Recent Paintings, National Gallery of Art, Washington, D.C.
- 2021–2022 – Oliver Lee Jackson–Any Eyes, di Rosa Center for Contemporary Art, Napa, California
- 2021–2022 – Oliver Lee Jackson, Saint Louis Art Museum, St. Louis, Missouri

=== Group ===
- 1976 – Other Sources: An American Essay, curated by Carlos Villa, including Ruth Asawa, Bernice Bing, Rolando Castellón, Claude Clark, Robert Colescott, Frank Day, Rupert García, Mike Henderson, Oliver Jackson, Frank LaPena, Linda Lomahaftewa, George Longfish, Ralph Maradiaga, José Montoya, Manuel Neri, Mary Lovelace O'Neal, Darryl Sapien, Raymond Saunders, James Hiroshi Suzuki, Horace Washington, Al Wong, René Yañez, Leo Valledor, San Francisco Art Institute, San Francisco, California
- 1983 — 1983 Biennial Exhibition, Whitney Museum of American Art, New York, New York
- 1984 – An International Survey of Recent Painting and Sculpture, Museum of Modern Art, New York, New York
- 1987 – The Ethnic Idea, curated by Andrée Maréchal-Workman, including Lauren Adams, Robert Colescott, Dewey Crumpler, Mildred Howard, Oliver Lee Jackson, Mary Lovelace O'Neal, Joe Sam, Elisabeth Zeilon, Tom Holland, Celeste Conner, Jean LaMarr, Sylvia Lark, Leta Ramos, Judy Foosaner, Joseph Goldyne, Belinda Chlouber, Carlos Villa. Berkeley Art Center, Berkeley, California
- 1989 — The Appropriate Object, Albright-Knox Art Gallery, Buffalo, New York, with travel to Detroit Institute of Arts, Detroit, Michigan; San Jose Museum of Art, San Jose, California; and Speed Art Museum, Louisville, Kentucky
- 1994 — The Exchange Show: San Francisco/Rio de Janeiro, Yerba Buena Center for the Arts, San Francisco, California, and Museu de Arte Moderna, Rio de Janeiro, Brazil
- 1994 – Continuing the Legacy of the Rockefeller Collection: Recent Acquisitions of 20th Century American Art, including Joan Brown, Wayne Thiebaud, Manuel Neri, Robert Arneson, Oliver Lee Jackson, Frank Lobdell. De Young Museum, San Francisco, California
- 2016 — Dimensions of Black, Museum of Contemporary Art San Diego, La Jolla, California, and Manetti Shrem Museum, University of California, Davis, California
- 2020 — Expanding Abstraction: Pushing the Boundaries of Painting in the Americas, including Alice Baber, Ibore Camargo, Fernando de Szyszlo, Helen Frankenthaler, Manuel Hernández Gómez, Grace Hartigan, Hans Hofmann, Dorothy Hood, Norman Lewis, Morris Louis, Kenneth Noland, Miguel Ocampo, Jules Olitski, Beverly Pepper, and Alma Thomas. Blanton Museum of Art, University of Texas, Austin, Texas
