= Sylvia Lark =

Native American painter, printmaker, educator (1947–1990)

- Born: Sylvia Scappator Lark; 1947; Buffalo, New York, U.S.
- Died: December 27, 1990 (aged 43); Berkeley, California, U.S.
- Resting place: Mountain View Memorial Park, Lakewood, Washington, U.S.
- Other name: Sylvia Lark Scappator
- Citizenship: Seneca, United States
- Education: University at Buffalo (BA), University of Wisconsin–Madison (MA, MFA)
- Occupations: Painter, curator, professor
- Movement: Abstract expressionism
- Spouse: Stephen Mack Chase
- Children: 1
- Awards: Fulbright grant (1977); CAA Award for Distinction (1991)
- Website: www.sylvialark.com

Sylvia Lark (1947 – December 27, 1990) was an American Seneca visual artist, curator, and educator. She best known as an abstract expressionist painter and printmaker. Lark lived in the San Francisco Bay Area for many years and taught at the University of California, Berkeley.

== Early life and education ==
Sylvia Lark was born in 1947 in Buffalo, New York. She went to high school at Nardin Academy in Buffalo.

Lark attended school at the University of Siena; the University at Buffalo (formally State University of New York, Buffalo) where she received her B.A. degree in 1969; Mills College; and the University of Wisconsin–Madison where she received her M.A. degree in 1970 and M.F.A. degree in 1972.

== Career ==
Starting in 1972, Lark taught art at California State University, Sacramento where she remained until 1976. In 1977, she received a Fulbright-Hays Program grant and traveled and study in Korea and Japan.

Lark taught at the University of California, Berkeley from 1977 until 1990. Students of Lark's included Shirin Neshat. She was awarded the Distinguished Teaching Award for teaching studio art by the College Art Association posthumously in 1991.

Her early work used symbols and patterns, and there was a shift in her later career with more abstraction and overlapping colors with delicate textured surfaces. She painted in oils and encaustics and printed monotypes. Her 1983 painting series Jokhang, featured many textures and layers of colors painted over or under black leaves. This series was a response to her visit to Jokhang Temple in Lhasa and her study of Tibetan spirituality. Lark was curator of the exhibition, Prints: New Points of View (1978) at the Open Ring Galleries in Sacramento.

In 1992, she was the second inductee into Nardin Academy's Alumnae Hall of Fame. Lark had served on the National Board of the Women's Caucus for Art from 1978 to 1984; and was the Regional Coordinator for the Coalition of Women's Art Organization from 1978 to 1990.

== Death and legacy ==
Lark died of cancer at the age of 43 in Berkeley on December 27, 1990.

Her works are in the museum collections at the Fine Arts Museums of San Francisco, Metropolitan Museum of Art, Crocker Art Museum, Sheldon Museum of Art, Oakland Museum of California, and the Museum of Contemporary Art, Chicago.

== Exhibitions ==
=== Solo exhibitions ===
- 1977, Sylvia Lark, (solo exhibition), Memorial Union South Gallery at University of California, Davis, Davis, California
- 1984, Sylvia Lark, (solo exhibition), Jeremy Stone Gallery, San Francisco, California
- 1987, Sylvia Lark: Paintings, (solo exhibition), Jeremy Stone Gallery, San Francisco, California
- 1992, Sylvia Lark: Casting Light/Acknowledging the Shadow, (solo exhibition), Fine Arts Center at Washington State University Museum of Art (now Washington State University Global Campus), Pullman, Washington

=== Group exhibitions ===
- 1975 – Drawings and Prints by Howard Hack, Sylvia Lark, and Leonard Sussman, San Francisco Museum of Modern Art, San Francisco, California
- 1977 – Lark–Palmer Prints and Sculptures, included Sylvia Lark and Jon Palmer, Fisher Gallery, University of Southern California, Los Angeles, California
- 1977 – Look, Touch, Rub, Pull, Smell, and Hear, included Carlos Villa, Chisato Nishioka Watanabe, Phil Weidman, Jon Palmer, Phil Hitchcock, Jock Reynolds, Laureen Landau, Sylvia Lark, William Maxwell, Bruce Guttin, Paul DeMarinis, and Jim Pomeroy, Artspace, Sacramento, California
- 1980 – Contemporary Trends in Presentation Drawings, curated by Roberta Loach, Linda Langston; including J.J. Aasen, Walter Askin, Gary Brown, Eleanor Dickinson, Bob Anderson, Harry Lynn Krizan, Judith Linhares, Roy DeForest, Robert Freimark, Sylvia Lark, Roberta Loach, Norman Lundin, Shane Weare, Vince Perez, Mary Snowden, Palo Alto Art Center, Palo Alto, California
- 1980 – Bhirasri Institute of Modern Art, Bangkok, Thailand
- 1983 – Galerie Akmak, Berlin, Germany
- 1985 – Galerie Hartje, Frankfurt, Germany
- 1986 – The 54th Hanga Annual, Japan-California Print Exhibition, Tokyo Metropolitan Art Museum, Tokyo, Japan.
- 1987 – The Ethnic Idea, curated by Andrée Maréchal-Workman, including Lauren Adams, Robert Colescott, Dewey Crumpler, Mildred Howard, Oliver Lee Jackson, Mary Lovelace O'Neal, Joe Sam, Elisabeth Zeilon, Tom Holland, Celeste Conner, Jean LaMarr, Sylvia Lark, Leta Ramos, Judy Foosaner, Joseph Goldyne, Belinda Chlouber, Carlos Villa, Berkeley Art Center, Berkeley, California
- 1991 – North Dakota Museum of Art, Grand Fork, North Dakota
- 2002 – Art/Women/California, Parallels and Intersections: 1950–2000, San Jose Museum of Art, San Jose, California

== See also ==
- List of Native American artists
