= Carlos Villa =

American visual artist (1936–2013)

- Born: December 11, 1936; San Francisco, California, U.S.
- Died: March 23, 2013 (aged 76); San Francisco, California, U.S.
- Education: San Francisco Art Institute; Mills College
- Spouse: Mary Valledor
- Children: 2
- Awards: American Academy in Rome (1987, 2000), Pollock-Krasner Foundation Award (1997); Guggenheim Fellowship (2012)

Carlos Villa (December 11, 1936 – March 23, 2013) was a Filipino-American visual artist, curator and faculty member in the Painting Department at the San Francisco Art Institute. His work often explored the meaning of cultural diversity and sought to expand awareness of multicultural issues in the arts.

== Early life and education ==
Carlos Villa was born on December 11, 1936, in San Francisco, California, to immigrant parents in the Tenderloin District. He was introduced to art when taking lessons with Leo Valledor, who taught him to study etchings by Matisse. Valledor and Villa were close friends and often referred to each other as "cousins" even though they were not related.

Villa started to display his work in 1958 and went on to receive a B.F.A. in Education in 1961 from the California School of Fine Arts (now known as San Francisco Art Institute), and a subsequent M.F.A. degree in painting in 1963 from Mills College. He studied under Richard Diebenkorn, Elmer Bischoff, Frank Lobdell, and Ralph DuCasse.

== Art career ==
During (1982) at the Smithsonian American Art Museum in 2023

In the early 1960s, Villa was associated with the Park Place Gallery Group in New York City and worked as a minimalist, focusing on textures. He moved back to San Francisco in 1969, ready to approach his work in a new manner.

Villa created multimedia projects and performances that he called "Actions." These were often group collaborations that dealt with multicultural topics. In 1976, Villa curated a multidisciplinary, multiethnic exhibition entitled Other Sources: An American Essay, that showcased work by Bay Area artists of color. This exhibition was an alternative celebration of the United States Bicentennial, and focused on people of color and women. It showcased artists including Ruth Asawa, Bernice Bing, Rolando Castellón, Claude Clark, Robert Colescott, Frank Day, Rupert García, Mike Henderson, Oliver Lee Jackson, Frank LaPena, Linda Lomahaftewa, George Longfish, Ralph Maradiaga, José Montoya, Manuel Neri, Mary Lovelace O'Neal, Darryl Sapien, Raymond Saunders, James Hiroshi Suzuki, Horace Washington, Al Wong, René Yañez, Leo Valledor. Live performances by Winston and Mary Tong, Mark Izu and Ray Robles, poetry readings by Janice Mirikitani, Jessica Hagedorn, and Al Robles, and numerous others.

In 1985, he had a retrospective exhibition, Carlos Villa:1961–1984, held at the C.N. Gorman Museum (now Gorman Museum of Native American Art), and at the Memorial Union Art Gallery at the University of California, Davis.

In 1995, Villa published Worlds in Collision, a book on multiculturalism in the arts. The contents were transcriptions of presentations and discussions held during the San Francisco Art Institute's symposia series entitled Sources of a Distinct Majority (1989-1991). The Worlds In Collision project continued in subsequent symposia, web projects and courses until 2013.

In 2010, Villa organized Rehistoricizing Abstract Expressionism in the San Francisco Bay Area, 1950s-1960s, a web project, symposium and exhibition at the Luggage Store Gallery that focused attention on contributions by women and artists of color (primarily abstract expressionist painters) that were overlooked by art history.

In 2011, Villa had a solo retrospective of his work entitled Manongs, Some Doors and a Bouquet of Crates at the Mission Cultural Center for Latino Arts in San Francisco. In 2020, Villa was part of the group exhibition Prospect.5: Yesterday We Said Tomorrow at Prospect New Orleans.

He was also the subject of the book Carlos Villa and the Integrity of Spaces (Meritage Press, 2011) an anthology of essays about his work and influence edited by Theodore S. Gonzalves, featuring essays and poetry by Bill Berkson, David A.M. Goldberg, Theodore S. Gonzalves, Mark Dean Johnson, Margo Machida, and Moira Roth.

== Teaching ==
Villa was a faculty member in the Painting Department at the San Francisco Art Institute where he started teaching in 1969. In the 1970s, Villa taught at California State University, Sacramento. Some of his former students include Paul Pfeiffer, Michael Arcega, Kehinde Wiley, and Barry McGee.

== Death ==
Villa died March 23, 2013, in San Francisco, from cancer and is survived by his wife, Mary Valledor, daughter Sydney and stepson Rio Valledor. Mary's first husband and the father of Rio was Leo Valledor, Carlos' cousin.

== Exhibitions ==
- 1977 – Look, Touch, Rub, Pull, Smell, and Hear, included Carlos Villa, Chisato Nishioka Watanabe, Phil Weidman, Jon Palmer, Phil Hitchcock, Jock Reynold, Laureen Landau, Sylvia Lark, William Maxwell, Bruce Guttin, Paul DeMarinis, and Jim Pomeroy, Artspace, Sacramento, California
- 1985 – Carlos Villa: 1961–1984, solo retrospective, C.N. Gorman Museum and at the Memorial Union Art Gallery, University of California, Davis
- 1987 – The Ethnic Idea, curated by Andrée Maréchal-Workman, including Lauren Adams, Robert Colescott, Dewey Crumpler, Mildred Howard, Oliver Lee Jackson, Mary Lovelace O'Neal, Joe Sam, Elisabeth Zeilon, Tom Holland, Celeste Conner, Jean LaMarr, Sylvia Lark, Leta Ramos, Judy Foosaner, Joseph Goldyne, Belinda Chlouber, Carlos Villa, Berkeley Art Center, Berkeley, California
- 2022 – Carlos Villa: Roots and Reinvention (solo exhibition), San Francisco Arts Commission Main Gallery, War Memorial Veterans Building, San Francisco, California
- 2022 – Carlos Villa: Worlds in Collision (solo exhibition), Asian Art Museum, San Francisco, California

== Awards ==
- 1959 – Honorable Mention, Richmond Art Center, Richmond, California,
- 1973 – National Endowment for the Arts Grant,
- 1973 – Adaline Kent Award, San Francisco Art Institute (SFAI), San Francisco, California,
- 1987, 2000 – Guest Artist, American Academy in Rome, Rome, Italy,
- 1989 – Distinguished Alumni Award, San Francisco Art Institute,
- 1997 – Pollock-Krasner Foundation Award,
- 1998 – Flintridge Foundation Grant,
- 2000 – Pamana Award, Filipino American Art Exposition,
- 2012 – Guggenheim Fellowship, Creative Arts, Fine Arts.
