= Dewey Crumpler =

American painter

- Born: 1949 (age 75–76); Magnolia, Arkansas, United States
- Education: San Francisco Art Institute (BFA), San Francisco State University (MA), Mills College (MFA)
- Occupation(s): Painter, professor
- Employer: San Francisco Art Institute
- Known for: murals, paintings
- Website: deweycrumpler.com

Dewey Crumpler (born 1949), is an American painter and educator. He taught at the San Francisco Art Institute (SFAI) for many years, where he held the title of associate professor.

Crumpler's work has been exhibited nationally and internationally, and is featured in the permanent collections of the Oakland museum of California; the Triton Museum of Art, Santa Clara, California; and the California African American Museum, Los Angeles. Crumpler has received a Flintridge Foundation award, National Endowment for the Arts fellowship grant, and the Fleishacker Foundation, fellowship eureka award. A digital image of his murals was included in the 2017 Tate Modern exhibition Soul of a Nation: Art in the Age of Black Power in London.

== Education and early life ==
Crumpler was born in 1949, in Magnolia, Arkansas, United States. He grew up in Hunters Point, a historically Black neighborhood of San Francisco, and attended Balboa High School, an arts magnet school, graduating in 1967.

He was involved in Civil Rights activism and showed his work around the city, eventually meeting artist Emory Douglas of the Black Panther Party. Both he and Douglas were part of group of artists who met at Evangeline Montgomery's apartment.

Crumpler graduated with a BFA degree in 1972 from San Francisco Art Institute (SFAI); a MA in 1974 degree from San Francisco State University; and a MFA degree in 1989 from Mills College. He also studied mural painting in 1974 with Pablo O’Higgins and David Alfaro Siquieros in Mexico City.

== Career ==
=== Teaching ===
Seeking advice on a 1974 mural commissioned by the San Francisco Unified School District, a young Crumpler entered Elizabeth Catlett's tutelage, and his life was changed when she connected him with famed muralists José Clemente Orozco, and Pablo O’higgins. Decades later, he appeared on a panel Honoring Catlett at the De Young Museum. Crumpler became a professor of history and studio art at the San Francisco Art Institute, where his notable students included Kehinde Wiley and Ionna Rozeal Brown.

Crumpler started teaching at SFAI in 1989 and was an associate professor of painting. One of his former students is Kehinde Wiley, known for painting Barack Obama's presidential portrait.

=== Artwork ===
Crumpler's work is in the permanent collections of the Oakland Museum of California, the Triton Museum of Art, and the California African American Museum.

==== Mural at George Washington High School ====
In 1936, Russian immigrant Victor Arnautoff was hired by the Works Progress Administration to paint a mural at George Washington High School in San Francisco. His work, Life of Washington, includes images of slavery and settlers stepping over a dead Native American.

Crumpler first saw the mural when he was a Balboa High School student visiting George Washington High School for a football game. He was impressed with the scale of the piece, but initially disliked how the work portrayed African Americans and Native Americans. A few years later, when he was 18 or 19, he was chosen to paint a corresponding mural in response to student activists upset by the Arnautoff work. To prepare for designing the mural, Crumpler traveled to around the country for research, which he was able to do due to his father working for Pan American World Airways. Crumpler viewed different murals and spoke with muralist William Walker. He then went to Mexico and received guidance from artist Elizabeth Catlett. In Mexico, he also met artists Pablo O’Higgins and David Alfaro Siqueiros. After being mentored by O'Higgins, Crumpler came to see Arnautoff's murals as a critique of George Washington, rather than a celebration.

After going through multiple approval processes, Crumpler painted his mural Multi-Ethnic Heritage at the high school. It portrayed Latinos, Native Americans, Asian Americans and African Americans in empowering ways, and included historic figures like Cesar Chavez and Dolores Huerta. He spoke out against the San Francisco School Board's proposed destruction in 2019 of Arnautoff's murals.

== Notable exhibitions ==
- 1987 – The Ethnic Idea, curated by Andrée Maréchal–Workman, including Lauren Adams, Robert Colescott, Dewey Crumpler, Mildred Howard, Oliver Lee Jackson, Mary Lovelace O'Neal, Joe Sam, Elisabeth Zeilon, Tom Holland, Celeste Conner, Jean LaMarr, Sylvia Lark, Leta Ramos, Judy Foosaner, Joseph Goldyne, Belinda Chlouber, Carlos Villa, Berkeley Art Center, Berkeley, California
- 2018 – Collapse: Recent Works by Dewey Crumpler (solo), Hedreen Gallery, Seattle, Washington

== Honors and awards ==
- 1967 – Honorary Resolution Award, Mayor's Office, San Francisco, California
- 1967 – Honorary Citation, California State Assembly, Sacramento, California
- 1969 – Purchase Award, Arts Commission, San Francisco, California
- 1975 – Outstanding Achievement Award, National Conference of Artists
- 1978–1977 – Purchase Award, Airports Commission, San Francisco, California
- 1978–1977 – Purchase Award, Fillmore-Fell Gallery, San Francisco, California
- 1985–1982 – Grant Award, California Arts Council, Artist In-Residence Program
- 1991 – Honored Artist Award, Pro Art Annual Exhibition, Oakland, California
- 1992 – Eureka Fellowship Award, Fleishhacker Foundation, Eureka, California
- 1995 – Fellowship Grant Award, National Endowment for the Arts
- 2005–2006 – Visual Artist Award, Flintridge Foundation, Pasadena, California
