= Patricio Moreno Toro =

Chilean and American artist (born 1942)

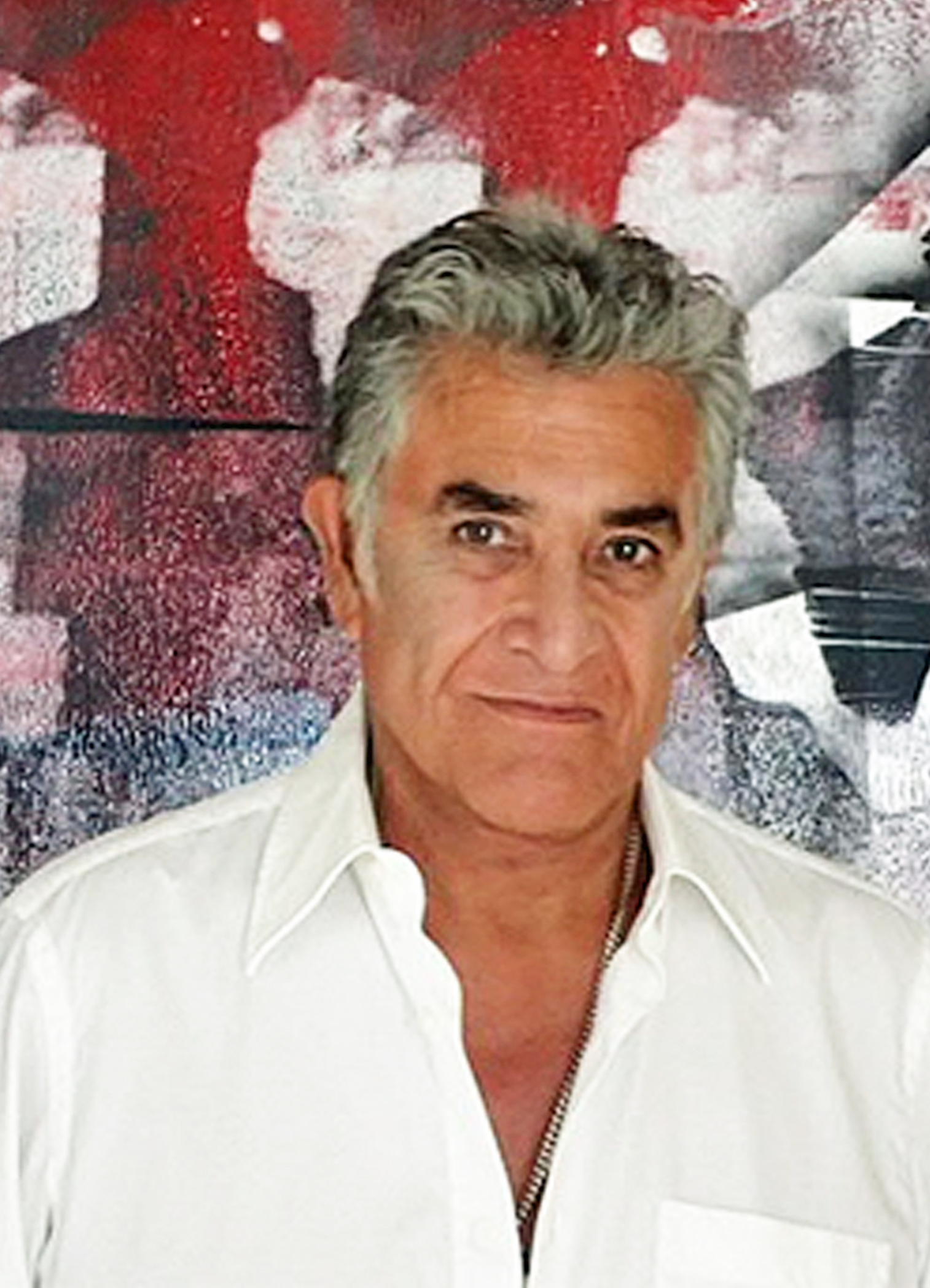
- Born: Patricio Salvador Moreno–Toro; December 21, 1942 (age 83); Santiago, Chile
- Other name: Patricio Toro
- Occupations: Visual artist, painter
- Spouse: Mary Lovelace O'Neal (m. 1980s–2026)
- Website: patriciomorenotoro.com

Patricio Salvador Moreno Toro (born December 21, 1942) is a Chilean-born American visual artist and painter. His work is associated with abstract expressionism and incorporates Chilean forms and details.

== Biography ==
Toro was born on December 21, 1942, in Santiago, Chile. He attended the University of Chile.

He immigrated to the United States in 1978, and he moved to Oakland, California, in 1981. In 1983, he met Mary Lovelace O'Neal and they married shortly afterward.

== Exhibitions ==
Toro has exhibited his works at Chilean National Museum of Fine Arts in Santiago; Museum of Contemporary Art and Design in San José; Örebro läns Museum in Örebro; University of Oxford in Oxford; Smithsonian Institution Offices in Washington, D.C.; California Science Center in Los Angeles; Kenkeleba Gallery in New York City; the San Francisco Public Library in San Francisco; Berkeley Art Center (1995); Los Angeles County Museum of Art (1981, solo exhibition); University of Hawai'i at Hilo (1990); Casa de las Américas (2017) in Havana; among others.

Toro was part of the exhibition Mano A Mano (1988), which featured 16 Chicano and Latino artists from the San Francisco Bay Area, shown at both the Art Museum of Santa Cruz County and at the Mary Porter Sesnon Gallery at the University of California, Santa Cruz.

Toro was part of the Carlos Villa–curated project, Rehistoricizing The Time Around Abstract Expressionism (2010), which highlighted more artist diversity within abstract expressionist art history. The Rehistoricizing project included a symposium, a website, and related art exhibition at the Luggage Store Gallery in San Francisco.

== Collections ==
- de Young Museum, San Francisco
- The Paul Robeson Collection, City of Berkeley
- Chilean National Museum of Fine Arts
