= Frank LaPena =

American Indian artist (1937–2019)

Frank Raymond LaPena
- Born: October 5, 1937; San Francisco, California, U.S.
- Died: May 2, 2019 (aged 81); California, U.S.
- Other names: Frank LaPeña, Tauhindauli
- Education: California State University, Chico, California State University, Sacramento
- Occupations: curator, painter, printmaker, photographer, silversmith, ethnographer, professor, dancer, writer, poet
- Spouse: Catherine Alice Sell Skinner (m. 1966–1984; divorced)
- Children: 2
- Parents: Henry LaPena (father); Evelyn Gladys Towndolly (mother)

Frank Raymond LaPena, also known as Frank LaPeña and by his Wintu name Tauhindauli (1937 – 2019), was a Nomtipom-Wintu American Indian painter, printmaker, ethnographer, professor, ceremonial dancer, poet, and writer. He taught at California State University, Sacramento, between 1975 and 2002. LaPena helped defined a generation of Native artists in a revival movement to share their experiences, traditions, culture, and ancestry.

== Early life and education ==
Frank Raymond LaPena was born on October 5, 1937, in San Francisco, California, to parents Evelyn Gladys (née Towndolly) and Henry LaPena. His family was of the Nomtipom-Wintu tribe, and from an early age he started learning about traditions from his elders and neighboring tribes including the Nomlaki Wintun.

When he was a child he was sent to attend federal boarding school at Chemawa Indian School, and later Stewart Indian School. He graduated from Yreka High School in 1956. He received a BA degree in 1965 from California State University, Chico, and his MA degree in 1978 in anthropology from California State University, Sacramento.

== Teaching career and ethnography ==
LaPena started teaching at Shasta College, from 1969 to 1971. He taught at California State University, Sacramento, within the art and ethnic studies departments, and served as the director of the Native American studies department between 1975 and 2002. He lectured on traditional and cultural Native American issues, including the California traditions.

In 1970, he was part of the Maidu Dancers and Traditionalists group as a founding member, ceremonial dancer, and instructor. He had notable students, among them was Harry Fonseca.

LaPena contributed cultural and ethnographic records to the seminal book, Handbook of North American Indians Volume 8: California (1978), and he was a frequent contributor to the journal, News from Native California, between the late-1980s and the 2000s.

== Art career and poetry ==
LaPena starting exhibiting his artwork in 1960 at a gallery in Chico. His artwork was shown nationally, as well as in Central and South America, Cuba, Europe, Australia, and New Zealand. He created works in various mediums including in painting, printmaking, silversmithing, photography, woodworking, and others.

LePena was part of the seminal art exhibition curated by artist Carlos Villa, Other Sources: An American Essay (1976), which was an alternative celebration of the United States Bicentennial, and focused on people of color and women. It showcased many San Francisco Bay Area artists including Ruth Asawa, Bernice Bing, Rolando Castellón, Claude Clark, Robert Colescott, Frank Day, Rupert García, Mike Henderson, Oliver Jackson, Linda Lomahaftewa, George Longfish, Ralph Maradiaga, José Montoya, Manuel Neri, Mary Lovelace O'Neal, Darryl Sapien, Raymond Saunders, James Hiroshi Suzuki, Horace Washington, Al Wong, René Yañez, and Leo Valledor.

LaPena served as a co-curator of the traveling exhibition, The Extension of Tradition: Contemporary Northern California Native American Art in Cultural Perspective (1985–1986) at Crocker Art Museum and Palm Springs Art Museum.

In 1999, at the 48th Venice Biennale, the exhibit “Rendezvoused", sponsored by the Native American Arts Alliance and curated by Nancy Mithlo (Chiricahua Apache), featured works by Frank LaPena and the artists Harry Fonseca, Bob Haozous, Jaune Quick-to-See Smith, Kay WalkingStick, Richard Ray Whitman, and poet Simon Ortiz.

Additionally, LaPena published several volumes of poetry.

== Death and legacy ==
LaPena died on May 2, 2019, at the age of 81. He was married to Catherine Alice Sell Skinner from August 19, 1966, until they divorced on April 12, 1984. They had two children, and LaPena had five step-children.

His artwork is included in public museum collections, including at the Museum of Modern Art (MoMA), the Cantor Arts Center, the National Museum of the American Indian, C.N. Gorman Museum, and others.

LaPena was featured in two documentary films, Frank LaPeña: Wintu Artist and Traditionalist (1988) and The Heard Museum Presents Frank LaPeña, Artist and Lecturer (1993).

== Publications ==
=== Exhibition catalogues ===
- LaPena, Frank R. (1975). Paintings and Photographs by Frank Lapena: An Exhibition, February 23 - March 29, 1975 (exhibition). U.S. Department of the Interior, Indian Arts and Crafts Board, Southern Plains Indian Museum and Crafts Center.
- LaPena, Frank R.; Brown, Christopher; Bean, Lowell John; Bates, Craig D.; Bibby, Brian; Blount, Clinton; Theodoratus, Dorothea; Longfish, George; Randall, Joan (1985). The Extension of Tradition: Contemporary Northern California Native American Art in Cultural Perspective. Crocker Art Museum, Palm Springs Desert Museum. Crocker Art Museum.
- LaPena, Frank R. (1987). The World is a Gift (exhibition). San Francisco, California: Limestone Press. OCLC 17004515.

=== As author ===
- LaPena, Frank R. (1978). "Wintu". In Heizer, Robert F. (ed.). Handbook of North American Indians Volume 8: California. Smithsonian Institution. pp. 324–340. ISBN 978-0874741889.
- LaPena, Frank; Bates, Craig D. (1981). Legends of the Yosemite Miwok. Harry Fonseca (illustrator). Yosemite Natural History Association. ISBN 978-0939666324.
- LaPena, Frank R. (1995). Commemoration: Words and Images. Okeanos Press.
- Dobkins, Rebecca J.; Caldwell, Carey T.; LaPena, Frank R. (1997). Memory and Imagination: The Legacy of Maidu Indian Artist Frank Day (exhibition). Oakland Museum of California. University of Washington Press. ISBN 978-0295976129.
- LaPena, Frank (2004). Dream Songs and Ceremony. Berkeley, CA: Heyday. ISBN 978-1890771799.

=== As editor ===
- Gilmore, Kristina Perea (2019). LaPena, Frank; Johnson, Mark Dean (eds.). When I Remember I See Red: American Indian Art and Activism in California. Crocker Art Museum. University of California Press. ISBN 978-0520300811.

== See also ==
- Timeline of Native American art history
