= Virginia Pérez-Ratton =

Costa Rican artist (1950–2010)

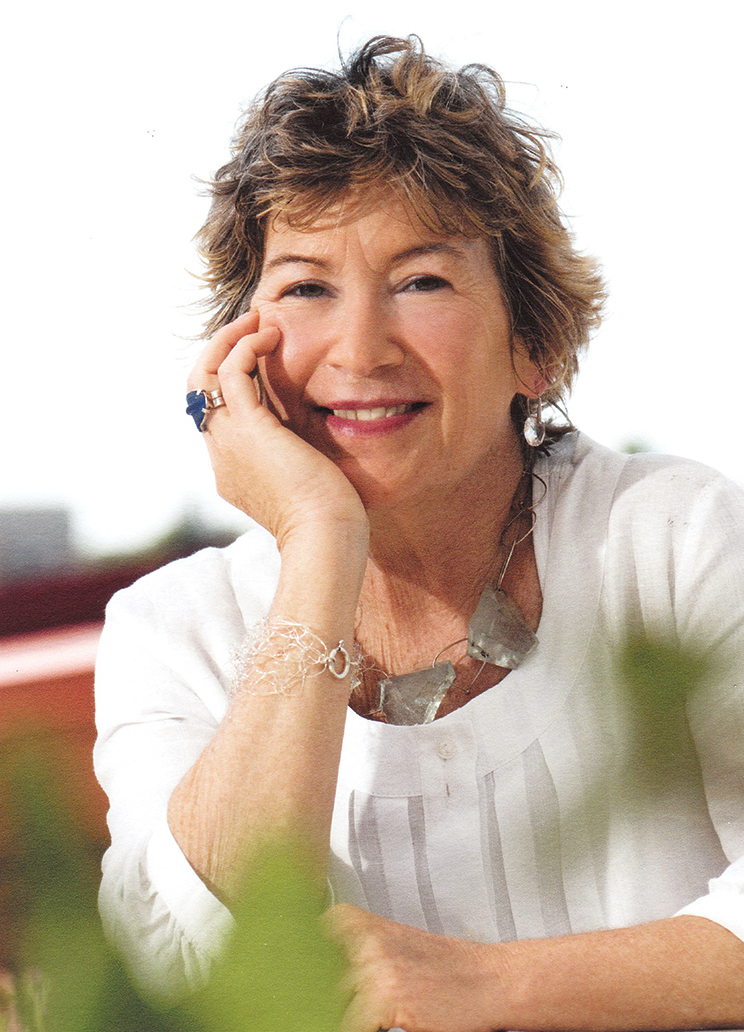
- Born: Virginia Pérez Johnston; 16 September 1950; San José, Costa Rica
- Died: 6 October 2010 (aged 60); Cartago, Costa Rica
- Education: University of Costa Rica, École nationale supérieure des arts décoratifs
- Awards: Magón National Prize for Culture Prince Claus Award

Virginia Pérez-Ratton (1950–2010). was a Costa Rican artist, cultural manager and curator. She devoted a large part of her life to the promotion of visual arts and the development of artists in Central America and the Caribbean.

== Biography ==
Virginia Pérez Johnston was born on September 16, 1950, in San José, Costa Rica. Pérez-Ratton obtained her academic degree in French literature at the University of Costa Rica. She got her first artistic training in Costa Rica from Grace Blanco (drawing), Lola Fernández (painting) and Juan Luis Rodríguez (engraving). In 1987 she continued her studies in Engraving at the École nationale supérieure des arts décoratifs in Paris, and later continued this study in Strasbourg, France. Most of her artistic practice took place during this period, as in the following decades she focused primarily on cultural management.

In 1994, Pérez-Ratton became the first director of the Museum of Contemporary Art and Design (Museo de Arte y Diseño Contemporáneo – MADC) in San José, a public institution that she helped found. From this museum, she organized a series of exhibitions of regional artists and stimulated many artistic initiatives, with the goal of promoting Central American contemporary art and placing it on the international art map. During her tenure, she curated exhibitions featuring artists such as Luis Gonzáles Palma, Cecilia Paredes, Miltón Becerra, and Marisel Jiménez, addressing themes such as art and the city, the body, photography, and installation art, always with a strong emphasis on contemporary production in Central America and other parts of Latin America.

In 1998, her tenure as director of the MADC concluded. That same year, she was invited by curator Paulo Herkenhoff to serve as regional curator for the XXVI São Paulo Art Biennial, the first edition of the Biennial to show a genuine interest in the artistic developments of Central America and the Caribbean. The Central American Pavilion focused on how the complex realities of the region had been represented through photography. Artists from thirteen countries, including Moisés Barrios (Guatemala), Regina Aguilar (Honduras), Sandra Eleta (Panama), Ernest Breleur (Martinique), and Allora & Calzadilla (Puerto Rico), took part in this historic participation.

In 1999, she founded TEOR/éTica, a nonprofit cultural organization whose mission is to promote research and dissemination of artistic practices in Central America and the Caribbean. From this platform, Pérez-Ratton continued to explore the interests she had previously developed at the MADC, while also promoting more theoretical and critical projects related to the region’s visual arts.

At TEOR/éTica, she developed curatorial projects that explored themes of identity, territory, politics, memory, and gender. During this period, she collaborated with international artists and cultural agents such as Harald Szeemann, Louise Bourgeois, Carlos Capelán, and Nikos Papastergiadis. The exhibitions — many of which were co-curated with Tamara Díaz Bringas — included both emerging and established regional artists such as Priscilla Monge, Federico Herrero, Patricia Belli, Carlos Garaicoa, and Regina José Galindo.

Her proposals aimed to deconstruct the stigmatized image of Central American art, while also offering ways to reflect on the consequences of globalization, neoliberalism, and armed conflicts in the region at the end of the 20th century. TEOR/éTica has continued its programming following these lines of thought for over 25 years.

In 2002 she was honored with a Prince Claus Award from the Netherlands. The jury described her as a re-inventor of Central America. According to the jury, she "managed to bring together the different artistic terrains of this fragmented and isolated region. With enormous tenacity she introduced artistic environments in and from Central America to each other and to the rest of the world."

In 2009 she received the Magón National Prize for Culture of the Costa Rican Ministry of Culture and Youth. The Magón Prize is the highest cultural award, granted by the Costa Rican State.

In addition to her work as an artist and cultural manager, Pérez-Ratton also developed a prolific career as a writer, researcher, and independent curator. Her thinking was strongly influenced by several of her contemporaries, such as Luis Camnitzer, Hans Ulrich Obrist, Mari Carmen Ramírez, and Édouard Glissant, among others.

The last years of her life, Pérez-Ratton struggled with cancer. The disease turned out to be fatal, she died in her house in Concepción de Tres Ríos, Cartago, Costa Rica on October 6, 2010.

== Selected Projects ==
- Regional curator for the Central American Pavilion at the 26th São Paulo Art Biennial, Brazil, 1998.
- Curator of Contemporary Art from Costa Rica, El Salvador, Guatemala, Honduras and Nicaragua, at the Taipei Fine Arts Museum, Taiwan, 1999.
- Organizer of Temas Centrales I: First Central American Symposium of Artistic Practices and Curatorial Possibilities, San José, Costa Rica, 2000.
- General curator of EV+A: On the border of each other, Limerick, Ireland, 2003.
- Curator of Estrecho Dudoso (2006), a large-scale exhibition event held across various venues in San José, featuring works by over seventy international artists.

== Awards ==
- Prince Claus Award (Netherlands), 2002
- Magón National Prize for Culture (Costa Rica), 2009

== Bibliography (selection) ==
- Pérez-Ratton, Virginia; Castellón, Rolando (1996). Mesótica II, Centroamérica Re-generación (in Spanish). Museo de Arte Contemporáneo. San Jose, Costa Rica: Museo de Arte y Diseño Contemporáneo. ISBN 978-9968-9824-1-2.
- 1998: Centroamérica Y El Caribe: Una Historia En Blanco Y Negro
- 2000: Costa Rica En La VII Bienal De La Habana: Cuba, with Alessandro Tosatti ISBN 9968899046
- 2001: Bienal Internacional de Pintura, with Adrián Arguedas, Emilia Villegas em Joaquín Rodriguez del Paso, ISBN 9968997633
- 2002: Priscilla Monge: Armas Equívocas, with Priscilla Monge
- 2003: Héctor Burke: Un Desaparecido, with Héctor Burke, ISBN 9968899100
- 2003: Liliana Porter: Una "Puesta En Imágenes, with Liliana Porter, ISBN 9968899119
- 2004: Iconofagia, with Tamara Díaz
- 2005: Enfoques A Distancia Sobre La Producción De Cultura En La Situación Contemporánea, with Nikos Papastergiadis en Carlos Capelán, ISBN 978-9968899192
- 2006: Estrecho Dudoso, with Tamara Díaz, ISBN 9789968899222
- 2007: Rolando Castellón, with Rolando Castellón, Rolando Castellón en Tamara Díaz, ISBN 978-9968899239
- 2009: Lida Abdul, with Lida Abdul, Els van der Plas en Nikos Papastergiadis, ISBN 978-8877572233
