= David Lance Goines =

American artist (1945–2023)

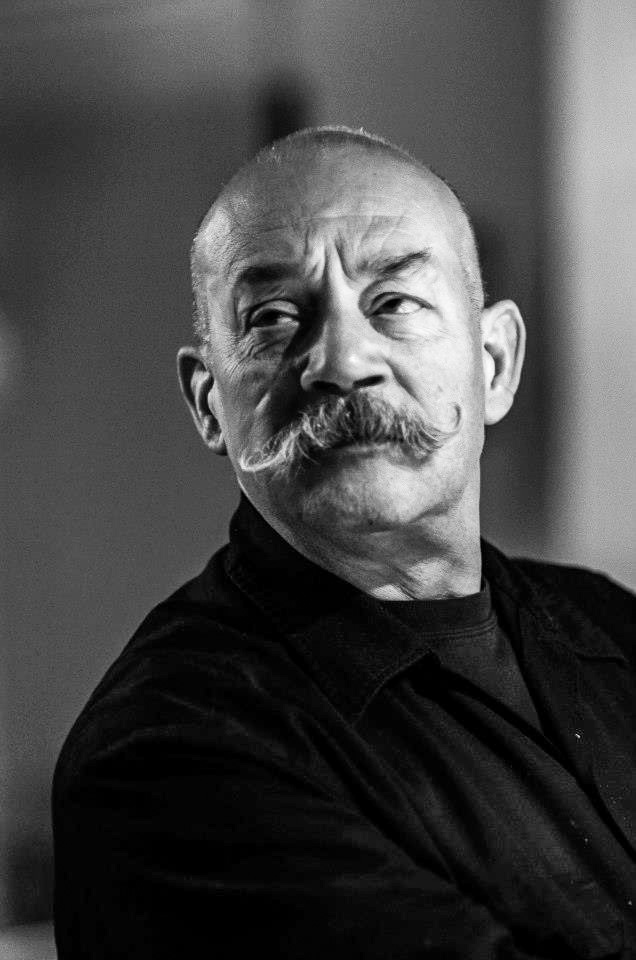
- David Lance Goines in Berkeley, CA (2013) Photo: Karen Frances Eng
- Born: May 29, 1945; Grants Pass, Oregon, U.S.
- Died: February 19, 2023 (aged 77); Berkeley, California, U.S.
- Education: University of California, Berkeley
- Known for: Artist, calligrapher, typographer, master printmaker, printing entrepreneur, author
- Notable work: A Constructed Roman Alphabet
- Movement: Minimalism
- Awards: American Book Award

David Lance Goines (May 29, 1945 – February 19, 2023), was an American artist, calligrapher, printmaker, typographer, printing entrepreneur, and author. He was born in Grants Pass, Oregon, the oldest of eight children. His father was a civil engineer and his mother a calligrapher and artist.

== Biography ==
David Lance Goines was born May 29, 1945, in Grants Pass, Oregon. He was the eldest of eight children and they were raised in Fresno, Sacramento, and Oakland. He attended Castlemont High School in Oakland.

During the 1960s, Goines enrolled at the University of California at Berkeley as a Classics major. While at the University of California, Berkeley he participated in the Free Speech Movement of late 1964, which led to his expulsion. Quickly re-admitted, he graduated the University in 1965, and apprenticed as a printer in Berkeley.

Goines was Alice Waters’ boyfriend in spring 1966, when she was helping Ramparts editor Robert Scheer's unsuccessful campaign for Congress.

Waters' and Goines' weekly cooking column in the San Francisco Express Times, book, 30 Recipes Suitable for Framing (1968), and the series of lithographs Goines printed at his shop that sold out its many printing runs, earned the money to buy the Berkeley Free Press print shop, in Berkeley, in 1968, from Leo Bach, renaming it, Saint Hieronymus Press. The major output of the press consists of Goines' limited edition poster and calendar art, distributed by Dow and Frosini. Portal Publications issued reproductions of forty originals.

Goines art style has been described as "minimalist". In 1982, Goines published the calligraphic classic A Constructed Roman Alphabet, which won him the 1983 American Book Award. Several books collecting his poster art have been published as well. Goines' art and posters can be found in international museum collections, including the Achenbach Foundation for the Graphic Arts, Fine Arts Museums of San Francisco, Cooper-Hewitt Museum, Smithsonian American Art Museum, Hiroshima City Museum of Contemporary Art, Metropolitan Museum of Art, Museum of Modern Art, Musee de la Publicite, Oakland Museum of California, Philadelphia Museum of Art, and Rochester Institute of Technology.

In addition to his artistic and calligraphic work, Goines was also a non-fiction author who had written about political activism. His book The Free Speech Movement: Coming of Age in the 1960s, was published in 1993.

Goines had enjoyed a friendship with the restaurateur Alice Waters since they were both teenagers. Every year Goines created a Chez Panisse anniversary poster and has illustrated many Chez Panisse cookbooks. He also designed the logotype and lettering for a number of Berkeley-based businesses, past and present, including Velo-Sport (a bicycle store) and the Scharffen Berger Chocolate Company.

A strong advocate of the voluntary blood donor system, Goines claimed to have donated a cumulative total of 20 gallons of blood during his life.

Goines died in Berkeley, California, on February 19, 2023, at the age of 77.

== See also ==
- Peter Rutledge Koch
- Lincoln Goines
