= Michael Arcega =

Filipino-American artist (born 1973)

- Born: 1973 (age 52–53); Manila, Philippines
- Education: Stanford University, San Francisco Art Institute
- Known for: Sculpture, installation art, performance
- Awards: Guggenheim Fellowship, Joan Mitchell Foundation, San Francisco Arts Commission, Artadia
- Website: Michael Arcega

Michael Arcega and Paolo Asuncion, TNT Traysikel, 2021.

Michael Arcega (born 1973, Manila, Philippines) is a San Francisco-based interdisciplinary artist who works mainly in sculpture and installation. Critics have described his work as a fusion of accessible materials, meticulous craftsmanship, politically barbed punning and conceptual rigor that balances light-hearted play with serious critique. His practice is informed by history, research, geography and his personal, insider-outsider sensibility as a naturalized Filipino-American; he frequently links historical eras and disparate geographies in order to address the present via the past. While visual, his art is often inspired by bilingual wordplay, jokes and jumbled signifiers. It explores cross-cultural exchange, colonization, sociopolitical dynamics and imbalances, and cultural markers embedded in objects, food, architecture, visual lexicons, and vernacular languages. Sculpture critic Laura Richard Janku wrote that Arcega "melds myriad aspects of past and present, high and low, humor and horror into the messy melting pot of history, politics and culture."

Arcega has been recognized with a Guggenheim Fellowship and awards from the Joan Mitchell Foundation, San Francisco Arts Commission, and Artadia, among others. His work has been exhibited at the Museum of Contemporary Art San Diego (MCASD), Museum of Fine Arts, Houston, Asian Art Museum (San Francisco) and de Young Museum, and in the California Biennial.

== Life and career ==
Arcega was born in 1973 in Manila, Philippines and migrated with part of his family to the Los Angeles area at ten years of age. As a child, he became fascinated by language, in part due to the potential for verbal mutation in his vernacular Tagalog, which is infused with Spanish and English words. This interest led to an early involvement with the textual and graphic forms of graffiti art. In the 1990s, he relocated to San Francisco to attend the San Francisco Art Institute, where he studied with Carlos Villa and received a BFA in 1999.

After graduating, he began exhibiting his work, appearing in group shows at the Oakland Museum of California and Yerba Buena Center for the Arts; the traveling exhibition "One Way or Another: Asian American Art Now" (2006–8, Japanese American National Museum, Asia Society and Berkeley Art Museum); the California Biennial (2008, Orange County Museum of Art); and solo shows at MCASD (2005) and the de Young Museum (2007). In 2009, he completed an MFA at Stanford University. He has had subsequent solo exhibitions at The Contemporary Museum, Honolulu (2009), Al Riwak Art Space (2013), Asian Art Museum (2014), and Unicorn Centre for Art (Beijing, 2019), among other venues. Arcega is an associate professor of art at San Francisco State University.

== Work and reception ==
Michael Arcega, Conquistadorkes I & II, Manila file folders and acrylic hardware, 72" x 20" x 10" (each), 2005.

=== Early work ===
Arcega first gained attention through group exhibitions in the early 2000s of unconventional works offering tongue-in-cheek critiques of colonialism and American politics and culture. For example, the installation Tanks a Lot (2004) was a nightmarish, Kafkasesque image of imperialist military spread and authoritarianism conflating cockroaches and military vehicles, with hundreds of miniature tanks swarming out of a hole in the floor and up a wall and ceiling.

Further recognition followed for his performance and sculpture work, The Maiden Voyage of El Conquistadork (Lucky Tackle Gallery, 2004; Museum of Contemporary Art San Diego, 2005). The project centered on his construction of a 10-foot-long replica Spanish galleon out of manila folders and rope, which he launched and sailed in Tomales Bay, referencing the historic Manila-Acapulco trade route and his own Philippines-to-Bay Area journey. Critics described the vessel as surprisingly sturdy, "model-airplane intricate and authentic" (with detailed balustrades, cloth sail and tiny Manila-rope rigging), and witty in its fusion of colonial and modern office cultures; The MCASD show included complimentary objects, such as faux-antique maps, seascapes, coats of arms, and Conquistadorkes I & II, two ornate, life-size suits of armor constructed from manila folders that stood goofily at attention holding hands, deflating the grandiosity of conventional museum displays that glorified war, privilege and conquest.

In subsequent exhibitions, Arcega layered contemporary signs and signifiers onto familiar historical objects, reworking the tools of colonial invaders in diverse works connecting religion, war, global capitalism and politics, Biblical, Dark and colonial ages, and contemporary American life. "Getting Mid-Evil" (Heather Marx, 2006) included In Gaud We Trust, 2006), a 12-foot, tilting Gothic cathedral façade with faux stained-glass windows, pointedly made of black petroleum-cast PVC that glistened as if drenched in oil; its spires were stylized oil derricks, its central crowning cross, a spout of crude oil. Arcega's contribution to "Asian American Art Now" was Eternal Salivation (2006), a 15-foot-long, wood replica of Noah's Ark whose hold contained strips of dried meat labeled with the names of birds and beasts rather than the animals themselves.

For "Homing Pidgin" (de Young Museum, 2007), Arcega was invited to engage with the museum's extensive Oceanic collections. He did so characteristically, through linguistic and visual puns, including a series of sculptures spoofing the museum's collection of "native" war clubs that consisted of unvarnished furniture legs and ax handles topped with miniatures of warship fragments or scale models of hotel and beach-resort nightspots ("Dance Clubs"), complete with colored lights and pulsing music inside their tiny walls. Other cultural inversions included Spork (2007)—a tiki-scaled, totem-like sculpture that turned the fast-food flatware into a quasi-religious symbol, alluding to both the cultural-culinary invasions of fast food and the popular carved salad utensils common to Filipino souvenir shops—and Spam/Maps: Oceania, a map of the South Seas islands made from slices of the anagramatic, hybrid foodstuff. In an Artforum' review, Glen Helfand wrote that Arcega "cleverly turned artifacts into multilayered jokes … cross-pollinating Homi K. Bhabha's theories of hybridity with the goofiness of Homer Simpson."

Michael Arcega, Baby (Medium for Intercultural Navigation), 2015.

=== Later work ===
In later work, Arcega has examined colonialism, anthropological practices, migrant issues and cross-cultural exchange. He expanded on his El Conquistadork performance-sculpture with Baby (Medium for Intercultural Navigation) (2011–12), a project in which he hand-crafted a collapsible Pacific outrigger canoe ("Baby") and journeyed West, mimicking Lewis and Clark's travels as an act of “decolonization" and collecting items and samples from the landscape used in later projects. He documented the voyages—surveying the economic and industrial structure of the US from the Mississippi and Rio Grande rivers, San Francisco Bay, and St John, Louisiana—with photographs, commemorative plates and the canoe itself in his 2012 exhibition at The Luggage Store.

That show also included "The Nacirema" ("America" backwards), which turned the tables on anthropological conventions with an inverted, detached examination of the "quaint" rites and talismans of mainstream America. It was inspired by a 1956 satirical essay by anthropologist Horace Mitchell Miner, and included such artifacts as the tater tot, piñata, microphone and Statue of Liberty. Arcega returned to the project in his 2015 show, "Espylacopa" ("Apocalypse" backwards). It included arrangements of odd and whimsical objects—some decorated (the "Beisbol Club" series adorned to evoke the primitive)—and others as he found them at flea markets or in the trash during an artist residency at San Francisco Recology; those included A (Nacireman) Colonist's Dream (Tools for conquest), an assemblage (nipple clamps, ball gag and whip) peeking from a vintage suitcase with a rickety mast and rigging structure balanced above, weaving themes of colonization, oppression and slavery. Artillery's Barbara Morris wrote, "Arcega's engaging work serves as a reminder that the 'other' is merely a construct created to arbitrarily divide society, instilling fear of that which is unfamiliar."

In his exhibition "Code-Switching" (Al Riwak Art Space, 2013, Bahrain), Arcega extended his geographical reach, examining the constrained social and spatial mobility of transnational and transoceanic migrant labor and the limits of revolutionary activism. In this work, he deflected censorship by foregrounding formalism and materials culled from the local landscape. Residue of a Gesture: one side of a non-verbal discussion distilled the modes of communication available to the disenfranchised in a readymade sculpture of an aerosol can of spray paint and an unexploded Molotov cocktail; Mothership 2: a proposal conjured futility, using plastic barricades and fences tied with rope to construct an oil tanker-like vessel rendered stuck and unusable by a concrete beam splitting its path.

Michael Arcega, Auspicious Clouds/Heavy Fog, 2018, San Francisco.

=== Public art ===
Arcega produced several public artworks during this later period, including three commissioned by the San Francisco Arts Commission: the permanent works Valencia Street Posts (2010) and Auspicious Clouds|Heavy Fog (2015)—a series of colorful cloud-motif benches in the Chinatown neighborhood—and TNT Traysikel (2018). He created a similar series of flower-motif benches for the city of Berkeley, Wildflowers, Bloom! (San Pablo Park, 2020). TNT Traysikel is a street-work collaboration with filmmaker Paolo Asuncion—a customized, traditional Filipino motorbike and covered sidecar, tricked out with sparkly lights, bright pom-poms and a functioning karaoke system. Common to the streets of the Philippines but one of only four in North America, the vehicle is designed as a visible cultural marker of the Filipino-American community and humble symbol of Philippine ingenuity and labor. It is inspired by the work of Carlos Villa, the artists' former mentor, who believed street life should inspire art.

== Recognition ==
Arcega has received a Guggenheim Fellowship (2012), awards from Artadia (1999), Artist Pension Trust (2007), the San Francisco Foundation (2008), Joan Mitchell Foundation (2009), Awesome Foundation (2019) and the San Francisco Arts Commission (2021). He has been awarded artist residencies by 18th Street Arts Center, Al Riwak Art Space, Artadia (ISCP), Bemis Center for Contemporary Arts, Headlands Center for the Arts and Montalvo Arts Center, among others.
