= Nardin Academy =

School in Buffalo, New York

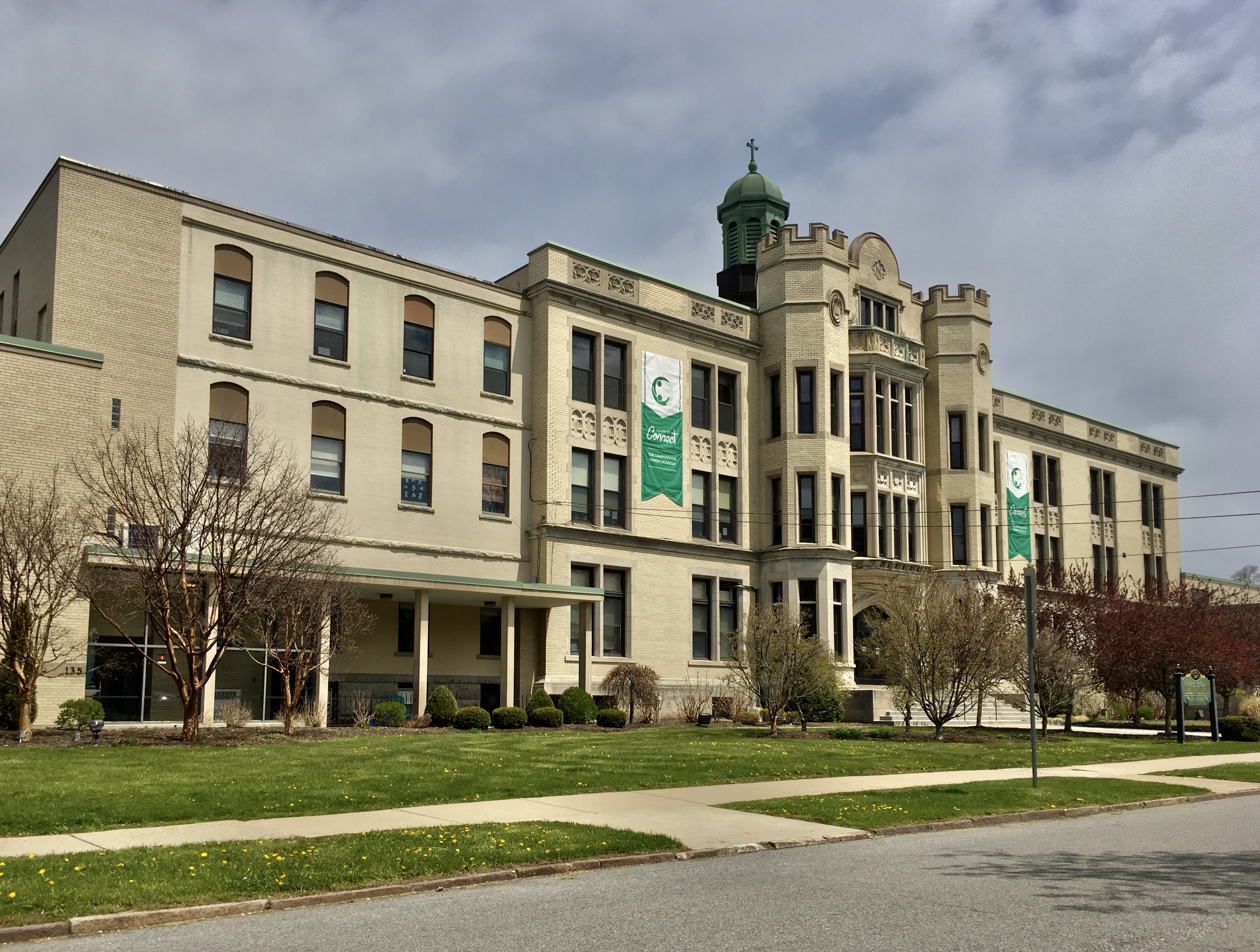

Location
- 135 Cleveland Avenue; Buffalo, Erie County, New York 14222; United States

Information
- Former name: St. Mary's Academy and Industrial Female School
- Type: Private; Grades toddler-3 Montessori; Grades PK-8 Coeducational; Grades 9-12 Girls high school
- Established: 1857
- Founder: Ernestine Nardin, DHM
- CEEB code: 331075
- NCES School ID: Y1985845
- President: Eric Miles
- Chairperson: Marsha Joy Sullivan
- Principal: Colleen Robertson (high school), Jill Monaco (middle school), Monica Padmanabha (lower school), Sarah Collins (Montessori)
- Grades: Toddler-12
- Age: 18 months to 18 years
- Student to teacher ratio: 10:1
- Colors: Green and White
- Sports: Track, Rowing, Basketball, Swimming, Soccer, Cross Country, Softball, Golf, Volleyball, Squash, Lacrosse, Tennis, Bowling, Field Hockey
- Mascot: Nardin Academy Gators
- Team name: Gators
- Accreditation: Middle States Association of Colleges and Schools
- Publication: Rare Patterns
- Newspaper: Kaleidoscope
- Yearbook: Rosarium
- Endowment: over $5 Million
- Affiliation: Independent
- Website: nardin.org

Nardin Academy was founded by the Daughters of the Heart of Mary in 1857. The academy includes a college preparatory high school for young women, a co-educational elementary school, and a Montessori school for toddlers through 3rd grade, and is located in Buffalo, New York.

== History ==
Nardin Academy was founded by the Society of the Daughters of the Heart of Mary over 160 years ago. Ernestine Nardin began the first Catholic school in Buffalo on Pearl Street before relocating to Franklin and Church Streets as St. Mary's Academy. It wasn't until 1890 that Miss Nardin moved the school to its current location on Cleveland Avenue. The school was named "The Nardin Academy" in 1917 and was changed in 1951 to the current "Nardin Academy."

Irene Murphy, DHM started Buffalo's first Montessori with the opening of Nardin Montessori in 1963. It was moved to the former John R. Oishei Estate on West Ferry upon its purchase (and Varue Oishei's generous donation) in 1996. It was finally opened to students in 1998.

Its campus is a contributing property in the Elmwood Historic District–East historic district.

== Admission ==
In order to attend the high school, one must first take an entrance exam. The exam, held in November, lasts about three and one half hours and covers a variety of topics, including Logic, English and Math. A written application process along with short essay questions accompanies the exam. Most prospective students shadow a freshman girl during the selection process or after admission. If a girl is selected, she is sent a letter of acceptance in January.

== Honors ==
In 2018, Nardin Academy High School was listed as the number one school in Buffalo, New York by Buffalo Business First for the seventeenth consecutive year.

== Notable alumni ==
- Diane English, Emmy Award-winning television producer
- F. Scott Fitzgerald, author, attended elementary school 1905-1908
- Sylvia Lark (1947–1990), visual artist; in 1992, she was the second inductee into Nardin Academy's Alumnae Hall of Fame.
- Susan Elia MacNeal, New York Times Best Selling Author
- Stavros Niarchos (1909–1996), shipping tycoon
- Anne-Imelda Radice, Chief of Staff to the U.S. Secretary of Education,
- Margaret M. Sullivan, Washington Post New York Times public editor; former editor, The Buffalo News
