= Carlos Capelán =

Uruguayan-Swedish artist (born 1948)

- Born: 1948 (age 77–78); Montevideo, Uruguay
- Education: Grafikskolan Forum, Lund
- Occupations: Artist, educator, curator
- Notable work: Jet-Lag Mambo, Hooks, Drawing with the Hand
- Movement: Post-conceptual art, Idea art, Installation art
- Awards: Guggenheim Fellowship (1995), National Prize Award (Uruguay, 2013), Swedish Royal Academy Prize, Prize of the 3rd Havana Biennial (1986)
- Website: capelan.com

Carlos Capelán is a Uruguayan and Swedish contemporary artist, educator and curator, born in Montevideo, Uruguay, in 1948. After two years hitch-hiking across South America, he returns to Montevideo in 1970 and opens a weaving studio. In 1971, his studio is raided five times by police and military. In 1972, he moves to the island of Chiloé in Chile where he works with peasant cooperatives as a weaving technician. In 1973, he is detained and disappeared during the military coup. He reappears in the Estadio Nacional among a group of 54 Uruguayans rescued by the Swedish Ambassor to Chile, Harald Edenstam. As a result, he ends exiled in Sweden and settles in Lund where he still keeps a studio.

He starts studying at Grafikskolan Forum in 1978 and opens his first solo show at Andres Tornberg Gallery. Between 1980 and 1981 he lives in Mexico where he leads courses at the studio of Uruguayan artist Anhelo Hernández. In 1981, back in Lund, he opens a print-making studio together with Carl Gustafsson and Stefan Sjöberg.

In 1986, he receives one of the awards at the third Havana Biennial. He returns to Havana in 1989 to hold several seminaries and lectures at the Instituto Superior de las Artes (ISA) and again in 1994 as celebrated artist of the fifth Havana Biennial.

In 1996 he discotinues working with his galleries in Germany, Colombia, Spain and France, and moves with his family to Costa Rica where he will live until 2001. During tha period he starts a close collaboration with Virginia Pérez-Ratton, at the time the Director of the Museo de Arte y Diseño Contemporáneo and later founder of the Fundación Teorética. From Costa Rica he moves to Santiago de Compostela, Spain where he will live until 2006. He moves back to Lund and then, in 2010 to Montevideo. Capelán moves back to Lund in 2013, where he still resides.

From 2000 to 2006 he was professor at the Bergen Academy of Art and Design, Norway. In 2007 he was artist in residence at Auckland University of Technology.

Capelán has participated, among others, in the biennials of Venice (Italy), São Paulo (Brazil), Kwang-ju (Korea), Johannesburg (South Africa), Site Santa Fe (USA), Auckland (New Zealand), MERCOSUR (Brazil), Bienal del Barro (Venezuela) and Bienal Paiz (Guatemala).

He has been awarded the prize of the Third Havanna Biennial, the Guggenheim Fellowship in 1995, the National Prize Award in Uruguay in 2013 and The Swedish Royal Academy Prize among others.

Professor at the Art Academy in Bergen, Norway, between (2000-2006) and a guest professor at the Art Academy in Oslo teaching as well in New Zealand, Italy, Cuba, Spain, China, Sweden, Colombia, China, New Zealand, Australia, Germany, Mexico, Spain, and Uruguay.

== About Capelán's work ==
Among those who have written on his work, are: Gerardo Mosquera, Thomas McEvilley, Paulo Herkenhoff, Ticio Escobar, Catherine David, Virginia Pérez-Ratton, Carla Stellweg, Fernando Castro Flórez, Sune Nordgren, Jonathan Friedman, Nikos Papastergiadis, Octavio Zaya, Gavin Jantjes, Ann-Sofi Noring, Jan-Erik Lundström, Victoria Lynn, Maria Lind and Edward Sullivan.

His work has been called post-conceptual. Free from specific trends or formal boundaries, he works with structures of ideas with a material and formal diversity operating from the language of representation, referrinig to his identity as an artist as well as the artwork's itself. Capelán's language includes drawing, print-making, painting, photography, installation, sculpture, objects, performance, workshops, lectures and texts, as well as his activity as curator.

I am not a modernist. I’m not leaving the past and escaping into the future at all. So I don’t see any complication between body and soul, nature and culture, conscious and unconscious processes. Traditionally an artist dealing with art based on ideas and concepts is not supposed to deal with craftsmanship. And artists dealing with general notions of history cannot personalise it, otherwise they land up with psychology and expressionism. I like to work with these tensions and have them present in my work. I am concerned with pointing to new contexts and transforming concepts into material objects. There is a visual as much as a conceptual dimension in the work I do, and I love dealing with both. I love this complexity (Carlos Capelán in an interview on his installation Jet-Lag Mambo)(Jantjes, G. 2000).

Every time Capelan announces the limit of a concept or the insufficiency of one model he is also invoking the question of sufficiency and need to take a step in another direction. There is no ultimate end. Each declaration of opposition is another form of entanglement with the opponent. (Papastergiadis, N 2008)

Hooks imply games of irony, one of the fundamental mechanisms that art uses to distance itself from its own setting, observing it, commenting it, as if it were something outside itself. Some of Capelán’s paintings, in which he paints with his hand instead of a brush, constitute a hook because they exhibit manual dexterity but advance concepts that have nothing to do with the art of painting. Threatened on one side, and attacked on the other, the observer is forced to remain on guard, distrusting that which is seen, forced to track meaning where it does not appear. (Escobar, T. 2008)
