= Shingle Springs Band of Miwok Indians =

Native American tribe in California

Total population
- 500 enrolled members (2012); 141 members living on the rancheria

Regions with significant populations
- United States (California)

Languages
- English, historically Miwok languages, Nisenan language

Related ethnic groups
- other Maidu and Miwok tribes

The Shingle Springs Band of Miwok Indians, Shingle Springs Rancheria (Verona Tract), California is a federally recognized tribe.

== Government ==
The Shingle Springs Band of Miwok Indians is an independent, sovereign tribal government led by an elected Tribal Council.

- Tribal chairwoman: Regina Cuellar
- Tribal vice-chair: Malissa Tayaba
- Council member: Daniel Burnett
- Council member: Jacky Calanchini
- Council member: Allan Campbell
- Council member: Pat Cuellar
- Council member: Brian Fonseca

== Reservation ==
Location of Shingle Springs Rancheria

The Shingle Springs Rancheria (38°41′48″N 120°54′18″W) is located in El Dorado County, California. It lies in the heart of Nisenan or southern Maidu territory Nearby communities are Shingle Springs and Diamond Springs.

On June 14, 2013, Rep. Tom McClintock introduced into the United States House of Representatives the bill to authorize the Secretary of the Interior to take certain Federal lands located in El Dorado County, California, into trust for the benefit of the Shingle Springs Band of Miwok Indians (H.R. 2388; 113th Congress). The United States Secretary of the Interior would be responsible for carrying this out. The United States Department of the Interior provided the following background information about the situation when it testified about the bill before the Subcommittee on Indian and Alaska Native Affairs of the House Natural Resources Committee: "On December 16, 1916, the Secretary of the Interior purchased the 160-acre Shingle Springs Rancheria east of Sacramento in El Dorado County, California at the request of the Sacramento-Verona Band of Miwok Indians. Today's members of the Shingle Springs Rancheria are descendants of the Miwok and Maidu Indians who once lived in this region. Currently, there are approximately 500 enrolled members of the Tribe, with about 140 living on the Rancheria. The tribe has expressed an interest in expanding the Rancheria by adding adjacent BLM-managed lands for improved access and additional residential housing for the tribe."

== Education ==
The ranchería is served by the Mother Lode Union Elementary School District and El Dorado Union High School District.

== Notable tribal citizens ==
- Harry Fonseca (1946–2006), painter

== See also ==
- Miwok people
- Sierra Miwok
