= Peter Rutledge Koch =

American printmaker, publisher, designer (born 1943)

- Born: November 15, 1943 (age 82); Missoula, Montana, U.S.
- Other names: Peter Koch
- Occupations: Letterpress master printmaker; book designer; educator; artist book publisher; poet; artist
- Spouse(s): Shelley Jean Hoyt (m. 1975–1984), Susan K. Filter
- Children: 1
- Website: www.peterkochprinters.com

Peter Rutledge Koch (born 1943) is an American letterpress master printer, artists' book maker and publisher, typographer, educator, author and book designer. Koch is internationally known for his fine press artists' books. Over the years he has published under a variety of imprints, including Black Stone Press; Peter and the Wolf Editions; Editions Koch; Hormone Derange Editions; and Peter Koch Printer and The Real Lead Saloon.

== Life and career ==
Peter Rutledge Koch was born on November 15, 1943, in Missoula, Montana..^{[1][2]} In 1978, Koch moved Black Stone Press to San Francisco and embarked on a one-year apprenticeship with book designer Adrian Wilson at his renowned press in Tuscany Alley.

Black Stone Press was dissolved by 1983, and the press was renamed Peter Rutledge Koch, Typographic Design. In January 1990, following the 1989 Loma Prieta earthquake, Koch changed his press name to Peter Koch Printers and moved the location to Berkeley, California.

Koch has extensive knowledge on typography, paper making, printmaking, bookbinding, and the design of books. From 1991 to 2011, he taught the history of the book and printing, "The Hand-produced Book in Its Historical Context," at the University of California, Berkeley (UC Berkeley).

In 2005, Koch and his wife, Susan Filter, founded the Codex Foundation, to preserve and promote the art of the book. The Codex Foundation has hosted the biennial CODEX International Book Fair since 2007.

Koch's books and artworks have been the subject of solo exhibitions at the New York Public Library, San Francisco Public Library, the Widener Library at Harvard University, Yellowstone Art Museum, and the Paris Gibson Square Museum of Art. The Cecil H. Green Library at Stanford University hosted the exhibition Peter Koch Printer: A Forty-year Retrospective (2017). The Grolier Club presented the exhibition Peter Koch Printer Retrospective (2019). A three-volume catalogue raisoneé, Peter Koch Printer a Descriptive Bibliography, was published by Stanford University Libraries to accompany Koch’s 45-year retrospective at Stanford University Libraries (2017) and at the Grolier Club (2019).

The Black Stone Press archives (from 1974 to 1982) are housed at the University of Delaware Library Archives and Special Collections. The Stanford University Libraries house his archives from 1984 to the present.

== Personal life ==
Koch was previously married to printer Shelley Jean Hoyt, from 1975 to 1984. Together they had one son. In 2005, he married Susan K. Filter, who works as a paper conservator.

== Publications ==
=== Books ===
- Koch, Peter Rutledge; Jury, David (2013). Book Art Object 2. Stanford, California: Stanford University Press. ISBN 9780911221503.
- Bringhurst, Robert; Koch, Peter; Trujillo, Roberto G.; Roth, Alison (2011). The Art of the Book in California: Five Contemporary Presses. Stanford, California: Stanford University Libraries. ISBN 9780911221466.
- Bringhurst, Robert; Koch, Peter Rutledge; Goldyne, Joseph (2015). Joseph Goldyne: Catalogue Raisonne of Books, Portfolios, and Calligraphic Sheets. Stanford, California: Stanford University Libraries. ISBN 9780911221572.
- Koch, Peter Rutledge & Schneider, Nina M. Peter Koch Printer: A Descriptive Bibliography, 1975-2016 (2017). Stanford, California: Stanford University Libraries. ISBN 0911221603

=== Portfolios ===
- Bringhurst, Robert; Koch, Peter Rutledge, eds. (2015). The California Tradition in Type Design (art/design portfolio). San Francisco, California: The Book Club of California.

== See also ==
- David Lance Goines
- List of book arts centers
