= Harry Fonseca =

Native American painter from California (1946–2006)

- Pow-Wow Club (1981) by Harry Fonseca, acrylic and glitter painting on canvas
- Born: Harry Eugene Fonseca; January 5, 1946; Sacramento, California
- Died: December 28, 2006 (aged 60); Albuquerque, New Mexico, U.S.
- Citizenship: Shingle Springs Rancheria and U.S.
- Education: Sacramento City College, California State University, Sacramento

Harry Eugene Fonseca (1946 – 2006) was a Nisenan Native American artist, and illustrator. He was an enrolled citizen of the Shingle Springs Band of Miwok Indians.

== Education ==
Harry Eugene Fonseca was born on January 5, 1946, in Sacramento, California. He was Nisenan and of Hawaiian and Portuguese heritage. He and his family belongs to the Shingle Springs Band of Miwok Indians.

Fonseca first studied at Sacramento City College. and then continued his study of art at California State University, Sacramento, with Frank LaPena, but later quit the program to pursue his own vision of art.

== Art career ==
“Fonseca’s work combines Native and European traditions, contemporary art, and his vision. Harry’s mix of influences is the best of America in that he consumed so much of culture and life, and he gave it back.”, said Patsy Phillips.

Fonseca's earliest pieces drew from his Nisenan heritage. He was influenced by basketry designs, dance regalia, and by his participation as a traditional dancer. Further, the creation of his people, as recounted by his uncle, Henry Azbill, became the source of a major 1977 work, Creation Story, which he would paint in many versions during his career.

In 1979, Fonseca began his popular Coyote series. Coyote, an Indigenous California trickster, appears in contemporary settings. As an example, his Coyote in the Mission depicts Coyote dressed in a leather jacket with many zippers and green hightop sneakers standing against a graffiti-covered brick wall in San Francisco's Mission District. Another image has Rousseauesque Coyote sitting in a Paris cafe.

In 1981 Fonseca illustrated a book, Legends of the Yosemite Miwok, compiled by Frank LaPena (Nomtipom Wintu) and Craig Bates.

Fonseca was particularly taken by petroglyphs in the Coso Range near Owens Lake, California, and petroglyphs from throughout the West and Southwest United States. In 1991 he reinterpreted the Maidu creation story using imagery influenced by petroglyphs. He began a series of paintings he called Stone Poems, that draw heavily from these petroglyphs. A series of these paintings were exhibited in the Southwest Museum (Los Angeles, California) in 1989 as well as the Nevada Museum of Art in 2021

The artist confronted the dark history of the California Gold Rush, where his work takes a political tone. These are small abstract paintings in which gold is the predominant color, along with traces of red which represent the blood of Native Americans shed by the gold seekers. Each painting also incorporates minerals from California's gold country. Fonseca wrote that they are "a direct reference to the physical, emotional and spiritual genocide of the native people of California". Many of these were exhibited in the Crocker Art Museum in Sacramento (1992) and the Oakland Museum as part of a larger Gold Rush exhibition in 1998.

He did many drawings and prints of Coyote and Rose, a female counterpart to Coyote, often depicted in a floral print dress. These became a mainstay of Santa Fe event posters.

Fonseca later introduced the Coyote Koshare in several of his works. “Coyote Koshare with Watermelons” situates the Coyote in a more traditional environment, at home at the pueblo and participating in sacred ceremonies. Fonseca's representation of the rainbow in each painting symbolizes the importance of the rainbow's image for Pueblo tribes. The greenery which hangs around the necks of the Coyote Koshares shows their commitment to maintaining the balance with the natural world, an indication of their spiritual significance.

Harry did several other series of paintings. One series painted in the 1990s was of images of Saint Francis, who appears as negative space in each painting. About the same time, he did a series of paintings of the Icarus story. Another series from 2002 was inspired by the striped patterns on early Navajo blankets. In 2003 he started to paint a series of abstract paintings of flowering tree branches, which he called collectively the Four Seasons, a small group of which were exhibited at the Smithsonian's National Museum of the American Indian in New York City.

Fonseca's work was part of Stretching the Canvas: Eight Decades of Native Painting (2019–21), a survey at the National Museum of the American Indian George Gustav Heye Center.

The Autry Museum of the American West exhibited Coyote Leaves the Res: The Art of Harry Fonseca from May 19, 2019, to January 5, 2020. The museum's press release on the exhibition, included his social positionality as an artist stating, "as a gay man and a person of mixed heritage, Fonseca used his art as a vehicle for self-discovery."

Fonseca's artwork was showcased in numerous exhibitions at prestigious institutions, including ethnographic, historical, and natural history museums. His work was featured at the Smithsonian's National Museum of the American Indian, the Institute of American Indian Arts Museum (now the Museum of Contemporary Native Arts) in Santa Fe, the Wheelwright Museum in Santa Fe, and the Oakland Museum in California. Fonseca also exhibited his series “Discovery of Gold and Souls” at the 1999 Venice Biennale

However, despite his achievements, Fonseca faced challenges as an artist living in Santa Fe, New Mexico. Some critics, notably John Baldessari, commented that Fonseca's location in Santa Fe limited his recognition as a serious artist, considering it a niche market. However, Fonseca remained dedicated to his artistic vision and continued to create thought-provoking and impactful works

== Collections ==
The Albuquerque Museum (Albuquerque, New Mexico), the California State Parks Central Valley Regional Indian Museum (Sacramento, California), Crocker Art Museum (Sacramento, California), the Denver Art Museum, the Eiteljorg Museum of American Indians & Western Art (Indianapolis, Indiana), Ethnological Museum of Berlin (Berlin), the Heard Museum (Phoenix, Arizona), the Honolulu Museum of Art, the Hood Museum of Art (Dartmouth College, New Hampshire), the Linden Museum (Stuttgart, Germany), the Monterey Fine Arts Museum (Monterey, California), the New Mexico Museum of Fine Art (Santa Fe, New Mexico), the Oakland Museum of California (Oakland, California), Oguni Museum (Oguni, Japan), the Pequot Museum (Mashantucket, Connecticut), the University Art Museum (Berkeley, California), the Washington State Arts Museum (Olympia, Washington), and the Wheelwright Museum of the American Indian (Santa Fe, New Mexico) are among the public collections holding work by Harry Fonseca.

== Death ==
Fonseca was diagnosed with brain cancer and hospitalized in the Veterans Administration hospital in Albuquerque, New Mexico, in August 2006. He died there on December 28, 2006.

== See also ==
- Margaret Archuleta
