= Paula Kirkeby =

American art collector, printing press owner, gallerist

- Born: Paula Ruth Zolloto; April 3, 1934; Lynn, Massachusetts, U.S.
- Died: April 2, 2016 (aged 81); Palo Alto, California, U.S.
- Other names: Paula Ruth Kaplan, Paula Zolloto Kaplan
- Occupations: gallerlist, fine art press owner
- Spouses: Stuart Kaplan (m. 1955–?; divorce), Phillip Norman Kirkeby (m. 1962–2011; death)
- Children: 3

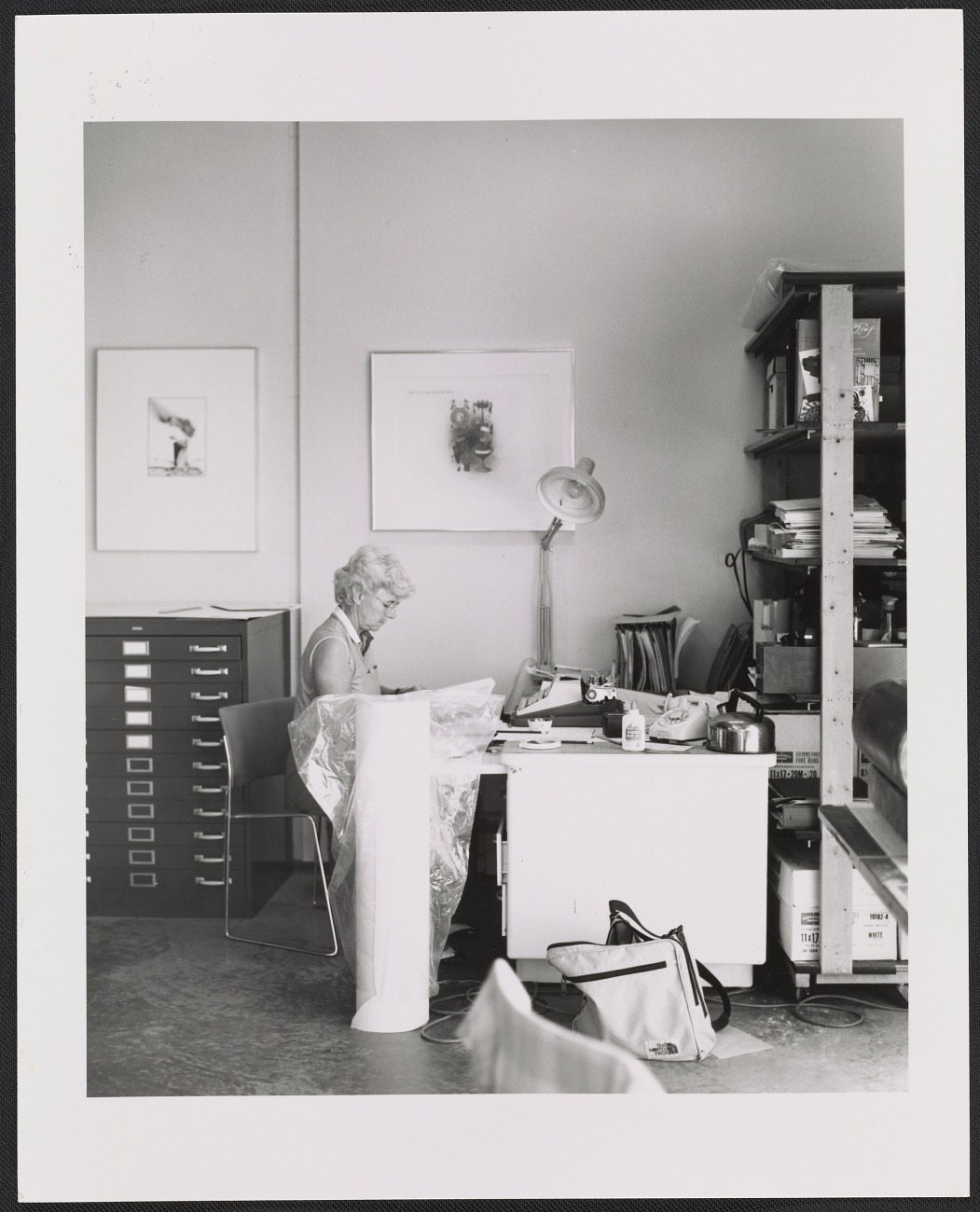
Mary Margaret "Moo" Anderson (June 1981), at 3EP Ltd. Press

Paula Zolloto Kirkeby (née Paula Ruth Zolloto; 1934–2016) was an American art collector, art donor, and the director and founder of a commercial art gallery. She was a co-founder of Smith Andersen Editions, 3EP Ltd. Press, and Smith Andersen Gallery. Many of the artists she worked with were part of the Bay Area Figurative Movement.

== Early life ==
Paula Ruth Zolloto was born on 3 April 1934 in Lynn, Massachusetts, and raised in Dorchester. She moved to Palo Alto, California in 1955, after marrying Stuart Kaplan. Her first marriage ended in divorce. She remarried Philip Norman Kirkeby in May 1962.

== Career ==
In October 1969, she opened Smith Andersen Gallery at 200 Homer Street in Palo Alto. The gallery's goal was to create more of a local art scene and they invited for exhibition both Internationally recognized artists and artists that taught at nearby Stanford University. Smith Andersen Gallery artists included Sam Francis, Bruce Conner, Ed Moses, Nathan Oliveira, Frank Lobdell, and Keith Boyle.

In 1978, Kirkeby alongside Mary Margaret "Moo" Anderson, and Joseph Goldyne founded 3EP Ltd. Press of Palo Alto. 3EP Ltd. Press remained in operation until 1984.

In 1984, Kirkeby became the sole owner of the press and renamed it Smith Andersen Editions, a fine art printshop and press that focused on monotype and monoprint. Smith Andersen Editions was located at 440 Pepper Avenue in Palo Alto. From 1991 to 2016, Kathryn Kain served as the master printer of Smith Andersen Editions. Smith Andersen Editions artists included Miriam Schapiro, George Herms, Enrique Chagoya, and others. After Kirkeby died in 2016, Smith Andersen Editions in Palo Alto was closed.

== Death and legacy ==
In 2001, Flanders Graphics of Minneapolis presented the exhibition, A Tribute to Paula Kirkeby and Smith Andersen Editions.

She died on 2 April 2016 in Palo Alto, California in her home.

After her death, she left her printmaking studio equipment to the Palo Alto Art Center. The City of Palo Alto dedicated June 13, 2016 to Kirkeby, for her service to the arts in the city. Santa Clara University’s de Saisset Museum unveiled a sculptural bench in her honor and memory.

== See also ==
- Bay Area Figurative Movement
