= Museum of Contemporary Art and Design =

Costa Rican museum

- Museo de Arte y Diseño Contemporáneo

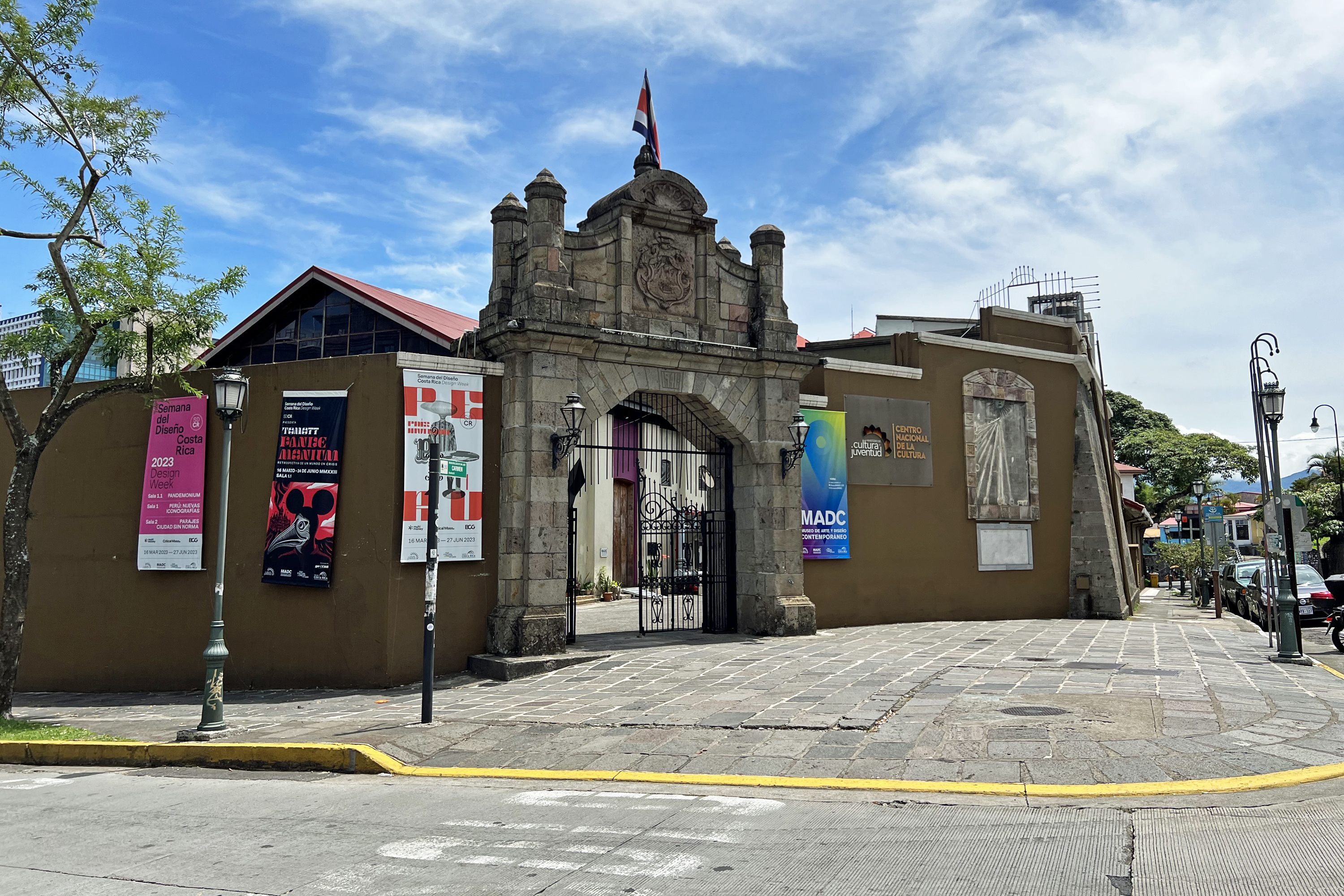
- Front entrance of museum
- Established: 1994
- Location: San José, Costa Rica on the former site of the old national liquor factory, founded in 1856. Currently the National Cultural Centre (CENAC)
- Coordinates: 9°56′08″N 84°04′19″W
- Type: Contemporary Art and Design
- Director: Fiorella Resenterra
- Curator: Maria José Chavarría
- Website: www.madc.cr

The Museum of Contemporary Art and Design (Spanish: Museo de Arte y Diseño Contemporáneo, MADC), founded in 1994, is a Costa Rican museum, specialising in contemporary Central American art and design, but also representing international work in the field.

== Building and collections ==
Occupying approximately 1,200 square meters in Costa Rica's capital, San José, the museum has four exhibition rooms, an auditorium, and the Pila de la Melaza — an open-air space for performances installations, and other events. There is also a small sales area, offering access to the museum's Web site, a Documentation Centre, and a Video Library, that includes video-art, documentaries about exhibits and performances. The library also hosts a wide range of art catalogues, art books and contemporary design books, which have been produced by the museum and other institutions.

The museum's permanent collection contains more than 900 works by both young and established artists, in a wide range of media, including painting, etching, sculpture, photography, installations, the intervened object, and video art. Selections from this collection are exhibited each year in the museum's galleries.

Since its founding, MADC has carried out a great quantity of individual and collective exhibits by national and international artists. One of the principal objectives is to exhibit artists and curatorial visions related with aesthetic, cultural and social issues which affect the Central American region and the world. The museum programme consists of art competitions, video-based exhibitions, digital art and emerging artists. The programmes and projects all contribute to the issues and concerns surrounding contemporary art and design in the Central American region.

== Educational and other activities ==
The museum holds competitions and hosts exhibitions in fields such as video creation, digital art, and emerging artists. It offers a regular programme of activities, including guided tours, conferences, talks and discussions on the museum exhibits and on general artistic and cultural themes, art workshops, and international video-cinema screenings and other activities that incorporate performance, video, music, etc. The museum also provides permanent consultation services to artists, specialists, and the general public. This service is based in the Centre of Documentation and the Video Library.

The MADC website provides comprehensive information about its spaces and key events, including past, present, and upcoming exhibitions; parallel programs and activities; images and details of the permanent collection; art brochures and catalogues; videos of museum exhibits; podcast interviews with artists and curators; seminars; and information and images relating to major national artists, institutions, and the broader context of contemporary art in Central America.

== Directors ==
Ana Luisa Piza Carrillo (1994), Virginia Pérez-Ratton (1994–1998), Rolando Barahona (1999–2004), Ernesto Calvo (2005–2008), and María José Monge (2008–2009).

== Curators ==
Rolando Castellón (1994–1998), Tahituey Ribot (2000–2002), Ernesto Calvo (2002–2004).
