= Priscilla Monge =

Costa Rican installation artist

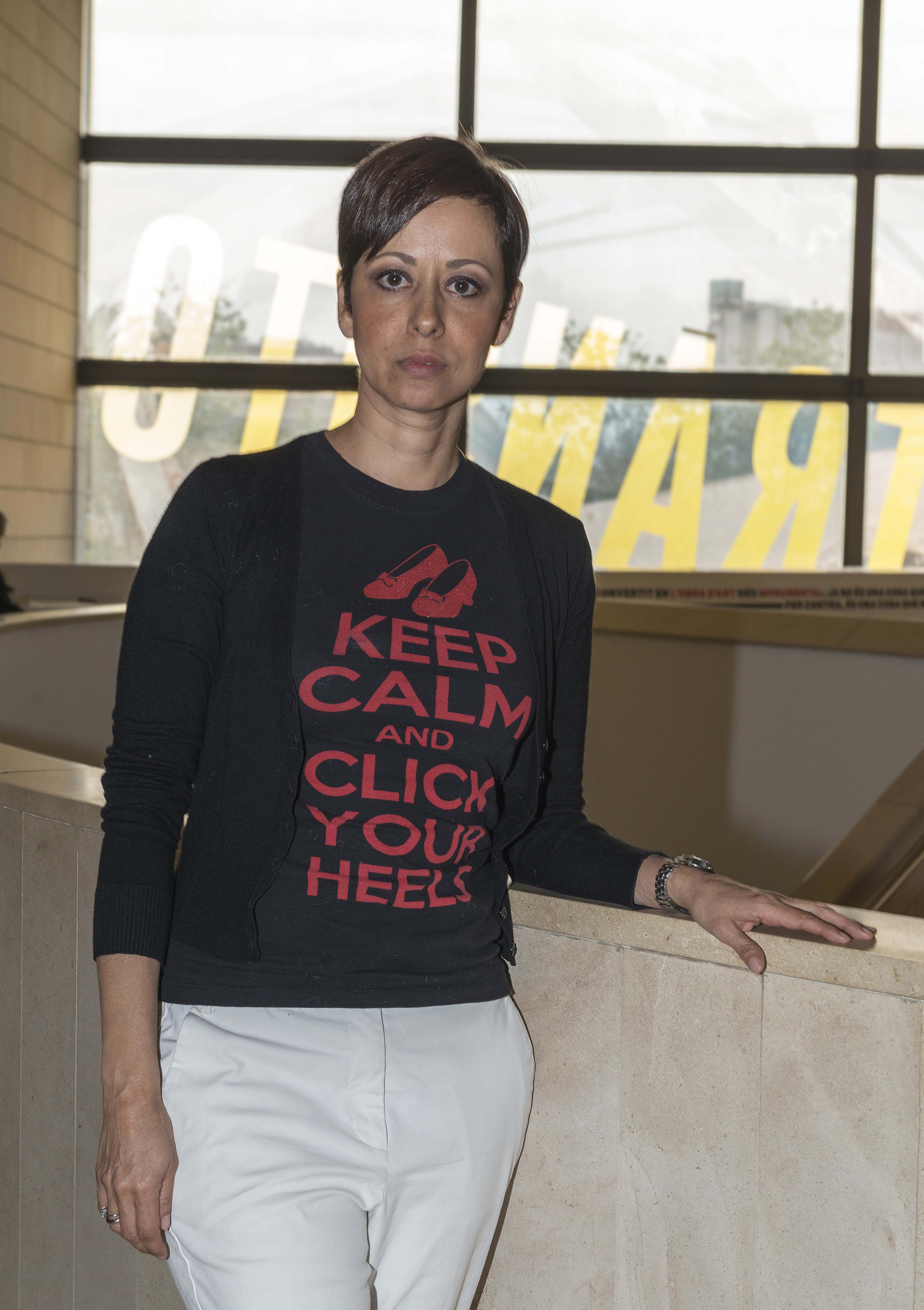
- Priscilla Monge in the IVAM, 2015.

Priscilla Monge (born 1968) is a Costa Rican artist. She is one of the best-known female artists from Central America.

== Early life and education ==
She was born in San José and studied art at the University of Costa Rica. In 1994, she settled in Belgium, staying there four years; there, she met the artist Wim Delvoye who had a strong influence on her development as an artist. Now, she lives and works in San José.

== Art career ==
Monge expresses herself through video art, installation art and photography. Her work often blends fragility and violence and is open to a multitude of interpretations. Because on the surface, all seems calm, the terror which lurks below the surface is more disturbing. Her work often deals with feminist issues.

Her work was included in the Venice Biennale in 2001 and again in 2013; she was also a participant in the Havana Biennial in 1997 and in the Liverpool Biennial in 2008.

Her work is included in the collection of the Tate Museum.

== Exhibitions ==
- 2019 – "Victoria Cabezas and Priscilla Monge: Give Me What You Ask For" – Americas Society, New York.
- 2013 – 55th Venice Biennial, Costa Rica Pavilion, Ca´Bonvicini, Venice.
- 2010 – Bienal de Pontevedra. “Utrópicos: Centroamérica y Caribe”. Comisario Santiago Olmo. Pontevedra, Spain.
- 2007 – "Global Feminisms" – Brooklyn Museum of Art, New York.
- 2006 – Liverpool Biennial of Contemporary Art 2006. Liverpool, UK.
- 2005 – "Points of View" – Photography in El Museo del Barrio's permanent collection. El Museo del Barrio, New York.
- 2004 – I Bienal Internacional de Arte Contemporáneo de Sevilla – BIACS. Fundación Bienal Internacional de Arte Contemporáneo de Sevilla, Spain.
- 2003 – OPEN e v+ a 2003 – ev+a. Limerick Biennial, Limerick, Ireland.
- 2001 – 49th Venice Biennial / Biennale di Venecia, Venice.
- 2000 – 24° Bienal de São Paulo, São Paulo, Brazil.
- 1999 – "Pervirtiendo el Minimalismo". Museo Centro de Arte Reina Sofía, Madrid, España.
- 1997 – Bienal de La Habana, Havana, Cuba.
