= Al Wong =

American artist and educator (born 1939)

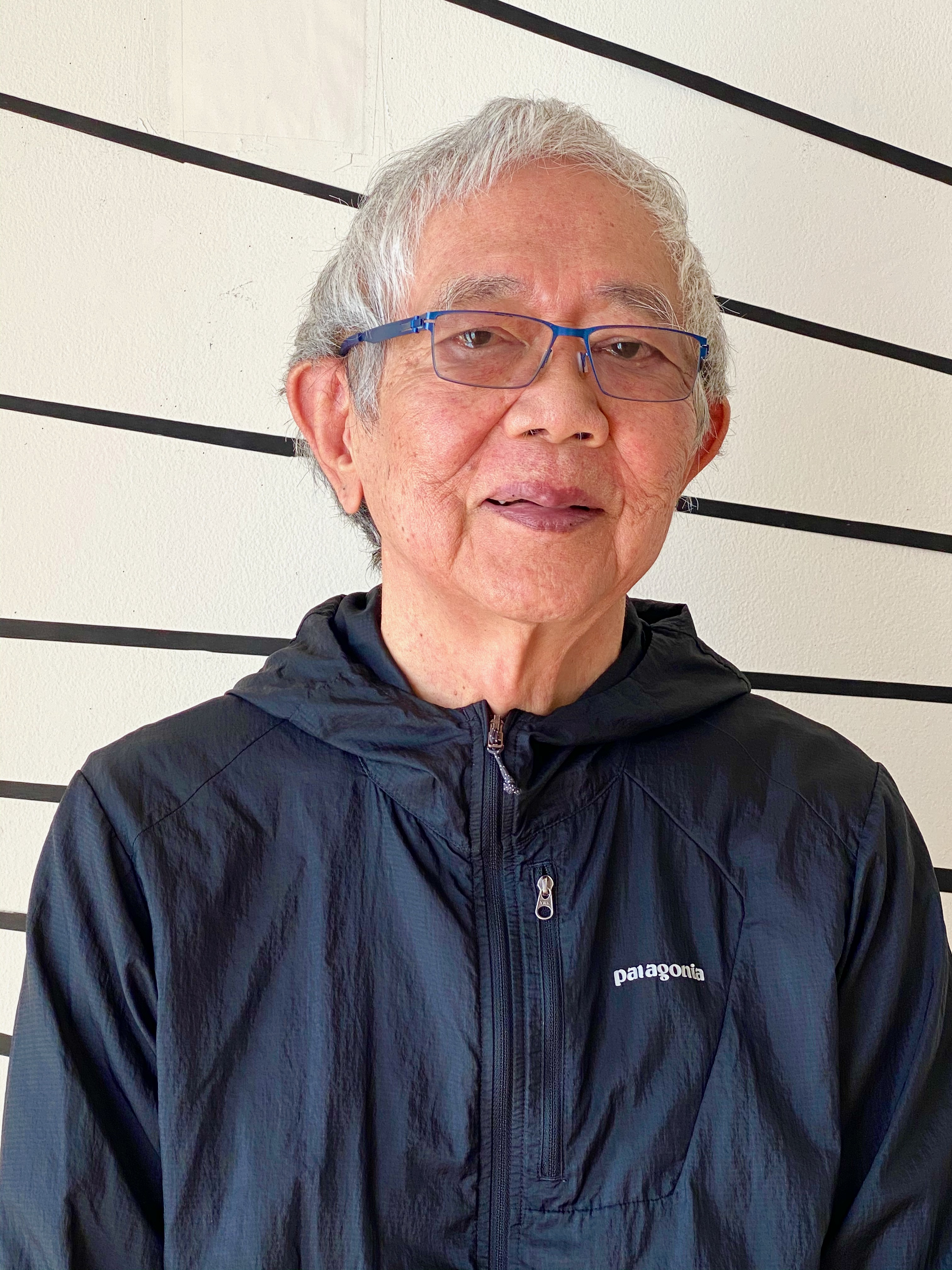
- Born: 1939 (age 86–87); San Francisco, California, U.S.
- Education: Academy of Art University, San Francisco Art Institute
- Occupations: artist, fine art professor
- Years active: 1968-Present
- Known for: Experimental filmmaking, mixed media installation art
- Website: https://alwongart.com/

Al Wong (born 1939) is an American artist and educator, known for his experimental film and mixed media installation art. He is based in San Francisco, California.

== Biography ==
Al Wong was born in 1939 in San Francisco, California to father Willie Wong. He attended San Francisco Academy of Art University from 1960 until 1962 and the San Francisco Art Institute (SFAI), from 1962 until 1968 and again in 1970 until 1971. He received a Masters of Fine Arts degree in 1972 from SFAI. He also studied with Shunryu Suzuki Roshi at the San Francisco Zen Center.

He taught classes at San Francisco Art Institute from 1975 until 2003, as well working as a lecturer at California State University, Sacramento from 1975 until 1977; and as an associate professor at Sonoma State University.

Wong started making films around 1965, with his first film screening in 1967 at the Expo 67 in Montreal, Canada. Wong's work was included in the, Other Sources: An American Essay (1976) multidisciplinary, multiethnic exhibition curated by Carlos Villa. In addition to filmmaking and film installation art, Wong also has created works on paper, light installations and photo installations.

Wong was awarded the Guggenheim Fellowship in Film (1986), and the Flintridge Foundation grant (1998). In 2023, he also participated in the second Chinatown Contemporary Arts Festival in which he showed his film Paper Sisters. He was inspired to make this film based on his experiences growing up under the Chinese Exclusion Act and named the film to allude to the "reduction of human beings to pieces of paper containing their immigration status."

== Filmography ==
Year	Title	Type	Length	Notes
1969	69 Cents a Pound	16mm film, black-and-white, sound	12 minutes	
1970	Tea for Two	16mm film, black-and-white, sound	5 minutes	In the collection of Berkeley Art Museum and Pacific Film Archive.
1971	Discount House	16mm film, color, sound	21 minutes	In the collection of Berkeley Art Museum and Pacific Film Archive.
1974	Moving Still	16mm film, black-and-white, sound	14 minutes	In the collection of Berkeley Art Museum and Pacific Film Archive.
1975	Working Class	16mm film, black-and-white, sound	14.5 minutes	In the collection of Berkeley Art Museum and Pacific Film Archive.
1975	Same Difference	16mm film, color, sound	17.5 minutes	The soundtrack is by Terry Fox. Same Difference was filmed in a kitchen window over the span of a years time.
1976	Corner	double 16mm film projection on wall corner, black-and-white, silent	16 minutes	
1977	24 F.P.S.	16mm film, color, sound	14 minutes	
1977	Twin Peaks	16mm transferred to video, sound	50 minutes	This film was featured in solo viewings at San Francisco Museum of Modern Art (SFMoMA) and Museum of Modern Art (MOMA).
1979	Shadow and Chair	16mm film installation, black-and-white, silent	10.5 minutes	
1980	Moon Stand	16mm film installation, black-white, sound	14 minutes	
1981	Philip Whalen	16mm film installation, black-and-white, sound	8 minutes	
