= Rolando Castellón =

Nicaraguan American painter and curator

- Born: Rolando Dionisio Castellón-Alegria; 1937 (age 88–89); Managua, Nicaragua
- Other name: Rolando Castellon
- Occupations: painter, curator
- Movement: Bay Area Chicano Art Movement

Rolando Castellón, also known as Rolando Dionisio Castellón-Alegria (born 1937) is a Nicaraguan American painter, author, art historian, and curator. He was a well-known contributor to the arts of San Francisco, California and he has lived in Costa Rica since 2013.

== Biography ==
Rolando Castellón was born in 1937 in Managua, Nicaragua. He became a naturalized citizen of the United States in 1983.

In 1966, he was a co-founder of the Casa Hispana de Bellas Artes in the Mission District of San Francisco. By 1970, Castellón was a co-founder of Galería de la Raza, alongside Ralph Maradiaga, Rupert García, Peter Rodríguez, Francisco X. Camplis, Gustavo Ramos Rivera, Carlos Loarca, Manuel Villamor, Robert Gonzales, Luis Cervantes, Chuy Campusano, and René Yañez.

He served as a curator at San Francisco Museum of Modern Art (SFMoMA), from 1972 to 1981; and at the Museum of Contemporary Art and Design, from 1994 to 1998.

His first retrospective art exhibition, Rolando Castellon: A Legacy of Mud, Post-Columbian Objects, 1981–1997 (1997) was held at the Art Institute of Chicago.

== Bibliography ==
- Castellon, Rolando (1978). Aesthetics of Graffiti: April 28–July 2, 1978 (exhibition). San Francisco, California: San Francisco Museum of Modern Art.
- Catlett, Elizabeth; Castellon, Rolando (1978). Rupert Garcia: Pastel Drawings, March 3-April 23, 1978 (exhibition). San Francisco, California: San Francisco Museum of Modern Art.
- Castellon, Rolando (1990). Patterns and Patents: Six Emerging African American Artists from the Bay Area (exhibition). Sesnon Gallery. ISBN 978-0939982127.
- Pérez-Ratton, Virginia; Castellón, Rolando (1996). Mesótica II, Centroamérica Re-generación (exhibition) (in Spanish). Museo de Arte Contemporáneo. San Jose, Costa Rica: Museo de Arte y Diseño Contemporáneo. ISBN 978-9968-9824-1-2.
- Díaz, Tamara; Castellon, Rolando (2007). Rolando Castellon: Post-Columbian Objects. TEOR/eTica. ISBN 978-9968899239.
