= Jean LaMarr =

Native American painter and printmaker from California

- Pahime Gutne
- Born: 1945; Susanville, California
- Died: 1 August 2026 (aged 80–81); Susanville, California
- Citizenship: Susanville Indian Rancheria and US
- Education: San Jose City College
- Alma mater: University of California, Berkeley
- Known for: printmaking, murals

Jean LaMarr (1945-2026) was a Northern Paiute/Achomawi artist and activist from California. She created murals, prints, dioramas, sculptures, and interactive installations. She was an enrolled citizen of the Susanville Indian Rancheria.

== Early life ==
Born in Susanville, California, Jean LaMarr was given the name Pahime Gutne (Purple Flower Girl). Her family was poor. She created her first mural when she was in fourth grade called "Sir Frances Drake Christianizing the Indians" and the experience was meaningful to her. She experienced racism from her teachers at school and had to hide her art making when at home from her father, who wanted her to pursue a more practical occupation.

== Education ==
LaMarr studied at San Jose City College from 1970 to 1973; at the University of California, Berkeley, from 1973 to 1976; and at the Kala Art Institute from 1976 to 1986. LaMarr's instructors at UC Berkeley weren't supportive of her representational art. Lamarr was attending school in San Jose during the Occupation of Alcatraz and she supported that movement. She then joined a group of artists that protested discrimination. The 1969 Third World strike in Berkeley influence her work, as did the Chicano artists Ester Hernández and Malaquias Montoya.

== Career ==
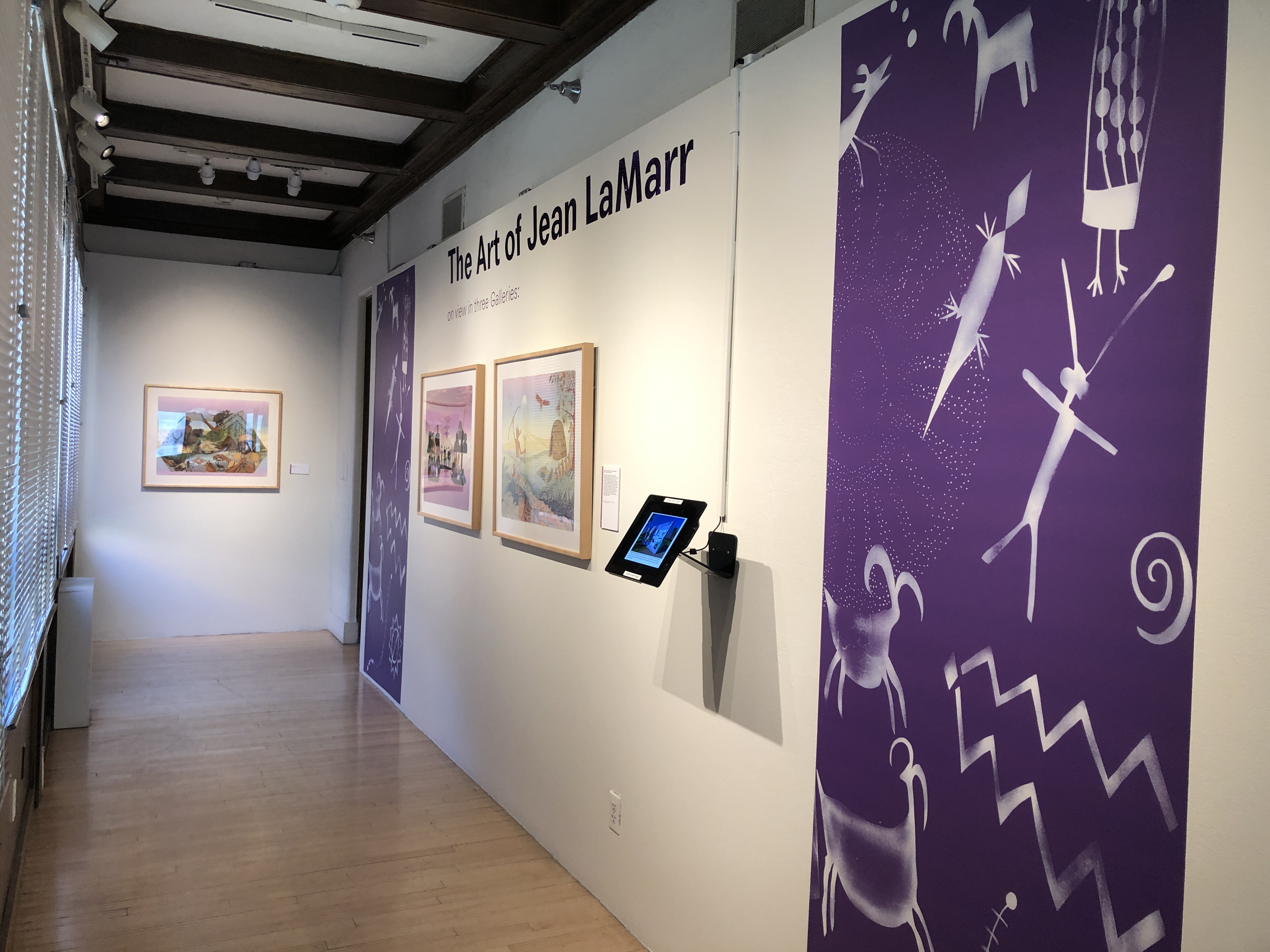
Jean LaMarr survey show entry wall at the IAIA Museum of Contemporary Native Arts

Between 1973 and 1990 she taught at such institutions as the College of Marin, San Francisco State University, the California College of Arts and Crafts, Lassen Community College, California Correctional Center, and the Institute of American Indian Arts. An active muralist, she is also known for her prints. She is drawn to the democratic quality of both media and has said, "I believe that art is for everyone. Art shouldn't be just for the museums or the rich, it should be for everyone and in everybody's home. That is why I started doing murals. That is also why I got into printmaking because it was a way of gathering minds, a way of raising consciousness about what is happening with the Earth, Indian rights, and the Indian woman."

Curator Jan Rindfleisch writes of LaMarr: "Jean LaMarr has honored and supported tribal communities for four decades. From drawing Indigenous youth during the 1960s to creating a compelling series of Bear Dance posters years later, her pictorial narrative counters the long-standing erasure of Indigenous presence. She often focused on women, celebrating and documenting their history and survival."

LaMarr is the founder of the Native American Graphic Workshop.

In 2022, the California Society of Printmakers recognized LaMarr's contributions to the field of fine art printmaking with a lifetime, honorary membership.

In 2022, the Nevada Museum of Art launched The Art of Jean LaMarr, a retrospective of more than 60 of her works. This traveled to the Boise Art Museum in Idaho and the IAIA Museum of Contemporary Native Arts in Santa Fe, New Mexico. The exhibition included prints, mixed-media works, paintings and sculptures, many dealing with the Native American women and cultural stereotypes. Her work critiques racist representations of Native peoples, especially women, as well as addresses the legacy of colonialism as well as environmental justice issues. Debra Harry, (Kooyooe Tukadu Numu from Pyramid Lake) who is also a professor of Indigenous Studies at the University of Nevada has written of the work in the exhibition: “Jean LaMarr speaks from a place of fierce pride in her indigeneity, and a willingness to challenge the erasure and structural racism that Indigenous Peoples face in their lives. Her work has that razor-sharp political commentary, yet can transmit the softness and beauty of our cultures, particularly of Indigenous women.”

== Personal life ==
LaMarr married DeeRoy "Spence" Spencer (Navajo 1945–2015), a Vietnam War veteran and designer. The couple has one son.

After Spencer's death in 2015, she unsuccessfully fought the Navajo Nation in court over where he was to be buried. The Navajo Nation ruled that he must be buried in Arizona in the community in which he was born, but LaMarr argued that he wished to be buried in their Susanville community.

LaMarr passed away on August 1, 2026 at her home in Susanville, California.

== Works ==
=== Prints ===
- Sacred Places Where We Pray, photo etching, 1990
- 500 Years of Resistance: Through Women's Eyes, screenprint, 1992, printed with René Castro at Mission Gráfica

=== Murals ===
- Our Ancestors, Our Future, mural, Lasson Street, Susanville created with Jack Malotte
- The Ohlone Journey, mural, Berkeley, California

== Selected exhibitions ==
- 1987: The Ethnic Idea, curated by Andrée Maréchal-Workman, group exhibition, Berkeley Art Center, Berkeley, California
- 1995: Violetly Volatile: Selected Mixed Media Works from 1974 to 1995 (1995), solo retrospective at C.N. Gorman Museum, Davis, California
- 2019–20: When I Remember I See Red: American Indian Art and Activism in California, Crocker Art Museum, Sacramento, California, curated by Frank LaPena (Nomtipom Wintu, 1937–2019)
- 2022–23 The Art of Jean LaMarr, Nevada Museum of Art, Reno; Boise Art Museum, Boise; IAIA Museum of Contemporary Native Arts, Santa Fe, NM
- Princess Pale Moon exhibition, Heard Museum, Phoenix, Arizona
