= Tom Holland (artist) =

American artist (born 1936)

- Born: June 15, 1936 (age 88); Seattle, Washington, US
- Education: Berkeley
- Known for: Abstract mixed media, geometric wall relief

Tom Holland (born June 15, 1936) is an American visual artist. Holland is known for creating a style of art that may use fiberglass (or fibreglass), aluminum (or aluminium), epoxy paint, plywood, beads, oil paint, palette knives, marble, copper, paper, and clay. For clay he uses watercolor, acrylic urethane, and ceramic glazes.

== Background and education ==
Holland began his formal art education at the University of California at Berkeley, where he was influenced by David Park before traveling to Chile as a Fulbright Grant recipient. Holland's early academic art influence was David Park at Berkeley, but his artistic style continued to develop through his travels and personal experiences.

== Career ==
=== Contemporary practice ===
His beginning as a painter was labeled "funky". It wasn't until Holland began to work with aluminum that he achieved critical acclaim. His work has been described as taking inspiration from Cubism, Futurism, and Constructivism, and he has been called one of California's most important contemporary artists and was featured in Art in the San Francisco Bay Area, 1945–1980: An Illustrated History.

Holland works primarily with fiberglass and aluminum to create free-standing and wall installations, a style that has been said to encompass Abstract Expressionism (8). He creates his art by riveting metal to the fiberglass or aluminum, then using epoxy paint to add other elements to the piece which add depth, light, and color. His work has been labeled exhilarating and visually challenging, playing games and distorting the three-dimensional space. Holland is represented by Bivins Gallery in Dallas, Texas.

=== Collections ===
- Anderson Collection
- Berkeley Art Museum
- Brooklyn Museum
- Charles Schwab Company
- Chicago Art Institute
- Cleveland Center for Contemporary Art
- Denver Art Museum
- Di Rosa Collections
- Duker Collection
- Federal Reserve Bank, San Francisco
- Los Angeles County Museum* Mayfield Fund
- Museum of Modern Art, New York
- The National Gallery of Art
- Oakland Museum of California
- The Official Residence of the United States Ambassador to Switzerland
- Palm Springs Desert Museum
- San Francisco Art Institute
- San Francisco Museum of Modern Art
- The Santa Barbara Museum of Art Collection
- Seattle Art Museum
- Solomon R. Guggenheim Museum
- Walker Art Center, Minneapolis
- Whitney Museum of American Art
