= Joseph Goldyne =

American artist

- Born: April 20, 1942 (age 84); Chicago, Illinois, U.S.
- Education: University of California, Berkeley, University of California, San Francisco School of Medicine, Harvard University
- Occupations: artist, printmaker, curator, author

Joseph R. Goldyne (born 1942), is an American artist, curator, and author. He is known for his monotype prints and drawing and he was one of the co-founders of 3EP Ltd. Press.

== Biography ==
Joseph Goldyne was born on 20 April 1942 in Chicago, Illinois. He is Jewish, and sometimes his artwork has religious themes.

He majored in art history, and received a B.A. degree at the University of California, Berkeley, and continued his studies and earned a M.D. from the University of California, San Francisco School of Medicine (UCSF). In 1970, he earned a M.A. degree in Fine Arts from Harvard University. After graduation from Harvard, he moved to Berkeley, California to work at the printmaking studio of artist Jeanne Gantz (1929–1987).

In 1978, Goldyne alongside Mary Margaret "Moo" Anderson, and Paula Kirkeby founded 3EP Ltd. Press of Palo Alto. 3EP Ltd. Press remained in operation until 1984.

The subject of Goldyne's artwork is often personal objects such as articles of clothing, food, and home decor. His work is commonly small scale printmaking with a combination of painting, and/or drawing. He creates series of prints on a single theme, most notably Diary of a Young Girl (Het Achterhuis) (1985); Women 9 (1976); Ten Firsts (1978); and Quartet (1986). Goldyne makes artists books with recurrent collaborations with printmaker Peter Rutledge Koch, including Five Ripe Pears (1996); Oda a la Tipografía | Ode to Typography (1998); and Hard High-Country Poems (2015).

Goldyne's work is in public museum collections, including the Smithsonian American Art Museum, the Metropolitan Museum of Art, Monterey Museum of Art, Fine Arts Museums of San Francisco, The Phillips Collection, Art Institute of Chicago, Victoria and Albert Museum, and the National Gallery of Art.

== Bibliography ==
- Goldyne, Joseph R.; Keller, Michael A.; Trujillo, Roberto G.; Koch, Peter Rutledge; Bringhurst, Robert (2015). Joseph Goldyne: catalogue raisonné of books, portfolios, and calligraphic sheets (exhibition catalog). Stanford University. Stanford University Libraries. ISBN 9780911221572.
