= Mary Lovelace O'Neal =

American painter (1942–2026)

- Born: Mary Felice Lovelace; February 10, 1942; Jackson, Mississippi, U.S.
- Died: May 10, 2026 (aged 84); Mérida, Yucatán, Mexico
- Education: Howard University, Columbia University
- Occupations: Artist, academic
- Known for: Painting, printmaking
- Movement: Black Arts Movement
- Spouses: John O'Neal (m. 1965–1960s; div.), Patricio Moreno Toro (m. 1980s–2026)

Mary Lovelace O'Neal (February 10, 1942 – May 10, 2026) was an American visual artist and educator. Her work is focused on abstracted mixed-media (primarily in painting and printmaking) and minimalism. She was a professor emeritus at the University of California, Berkeley, where she retired from teaching in 2006. O'Neal's art has been exhibited widely throughout North America and internationally, with group and solo shows in Italy, France, Chile, Senegal, and Nigeria. She lived in Oakland, California, and maintained a studio in Chile, and later in Mexico.

== Early life and education ==
Mary Felice Lovelace was born on February 10, 1942, in Jackson, Mississippi. She credited her father with nurturing her love of the arts. During her childhood and adolescence O'Neal's father, Ariel Lovelace, was choir director and professor of music at Tougaloo College and the University of Arkansas at Pine Bluff. She spent most of her youth in Pine Bluff.

O'Neal attended Howard University in Washington, DC, from 1960 to 1964 and studied with David Driskell, Lois Mailou Jones, and James A. Porter, receiving her B.F.A. in 1964. She attended the Skowhegan School of Painting and Sculpture in Maine during the summer of 1963. During her time at Howard University, O'Neal became active in the Civil Rights Movement and mentored by many influential leaders in the movement, including Stokely Carmichael, Jacob Lawrence and his wife, painter Gwendolyn Lawrence. She worked briefly at the Free Southern Theater (FST) with one of the theatre founders, her first husband John O'Neal.

She continued her fine arts education at Columbia University, studying with Aja Junger, Stephen Greene, Leon Golden, and Andra Rat. While at Columbia, O'Neal became involved in the Black Art Movement in New York City, which further influenced her work. She received her M.F.A. from Columbia University in 1969.

== Career ==
Forbidden Fruit (c. 1990) at the Baltimore Museum of Art in 2022

O'Neal's paintings progressed through different phases over the course of her long career, beginning with loose forms and evolving into more precise patterns. O'Neal received numerous awards and exhibited in many national and international exhibitions throughout her career. She was invited as resident artist to participate in the international arts festival in Asilah, Morocco, in 1983. O'Neal curated an exhibition for the Museo Nacional de Bellas Artes in Santiago, Chile, "17 Artistas Latino y Afro Americanos en USA" in 1991. Two years later, she received the Artist En France Award sponsored by the French government and Moet & Chandon. In 2005, she was selected to represent Mississippi in the Committees Exhibition at the National Museum of Women in the Arts in Washington, DC.

O'Neal started teaching full-time at University of California, Berkeley, in 1978. In 1985 she became the first African American artist to receive tenure in the department of art, and then appointed in 1999 as the Chair of the Department of Art Practice until her retirement in 2006. She has taught at several institutions in the U.S. including the University of Texas at Austin, San Francisco Art Institute, and the California College of Arts and Crafts in Oakland, California. She also taught internationally at the Universidad Jorge Tadeo Lozano, Bogota, Colombia.

In 1984, O'Neal worked on monotype printmaking with Robert Blackburn at the Robert Blackburn Printmaking Workshop in New York City. She enjoyed the process and she explored various other printing processes and printed over 200 prints at Blackburn's shop over the years.

Her involvement with civil rights movements, and how it is represented in her art, cannot be fully understood without mentioning the influence of Stokely Carmichael (O'Neal's onetime boyfriend) who coined the terms "Black Power" and "Black Panther" meaning "Power to the People". O'Neal traced her activism to Carmichael, and in an interview with Bomb Magazine, O’Neal recalled how a chance encounter living in Morocco with other printmakers and creatives inspired her 1984 series Panthers in my Father’s Palace, a likely homage to her experience being a Mississippi native. Akin to O'Neal's experience with abstract layering, she began collecting torn sheets of paper from printmaking studios in the early 1990s, breathing new life into another man's trash- reconstructing waste into experimental collage paintings. Along with Toro, who introduced new mediums and experimented with O'Neal, they displayed their original works at the Triennale Mondiale d’Estampes held at the Musée d'Art Contemporaine de Chemalieres, France.

=== Lampblack series, 1960s–1970s ===
O'Neal developed these paintings while earning her MFA at Columbia University. This series of monochromes, made in the late 1960s-early 70s, were monumental and made using ebony pigment that was rubbed into raw unstretched canvas using a chalkboard eraser or her hands. The deep black of the surface could, according to Jan Avgikos, "absorb and silence the noise of ideology, activate space, and impact the body".

In 2025, O'Neal received the Murray Reich Distinguished Artist Award.

== Personal life and death ==
O'Neal dated activist Stokely Carmichael, whom she met while attending Howard University in the 1960s. Her first husband was John O'Neal in 1965, and that marriage ended in divorce. In 1983, O'Neal met the Chilean painter Patricio Moreno Toro, whom she eventually married.

O'Neal died in Mérida, Yucatán, Mexico, on May 10, 2026, at the age of 84.

== Exhibitions ==
In February 2020, the Mnuchin Gallery held O'Neal's first solo exhibition in New York since 1993, which surveyed over five decades of her work, from the late 1960s through 2000s. The mini retrospective, Chasing Down the Image, revealed the ways in which O'Neal engaged abstraction and materiality exuberantly for political ends, marrying experimental black aesthetics with influences of Minimalism. She was engaged with issues taken up by Donald Judd, Frank Stella, and Sam Gilliam while simultaneously having conversations with Amiri Baraka who pushed her to make images of the Black Power movement instead of abstraction. During the 1960s and 70s O'Neal's abstraction went against the emphasis placed on figuration by the Black Arts Movement and the Black Panthers as a means for Black empowerment. According to a review by Jan Avgikos, O'Neal's work "insists on the aesthetic integration of experiences and styles once construed to be mutually exclusive".

In March 2020, the Museum of the African Diaspora mounted a solo exhibition of O'Neal's Whales Fucking series from the 1970s. These expressionist abstract landscapes were made in response to her first visit to the Bay Area that decade. They are made using oil paint, glitter, and tape.

In 2024, O'Neal was included in the 2024 Whitney Biennial, "Even Better than the Real Thing". She shared three paintings—one from her Whales Fucking series (1979 – early 1980s), one from her Two Deserts, Three Winters series (1990s), and one from her newest body of work, The Mexico Works (2021–23). At the same time, she showcased a solo show of eerie, rhapsodic paintings at Marianne Boesky. Titled, HECHO EN MÉXICO—a mano (MADE IN MEXICO—by hand), the show included monumental canvases made over the past three years in the artist’s studio in Mérida, Mexico.

Her work was included in the 2024 exhibition Making Their Mark: Works from the Shah Garg Collection at the Berkeley Art Museum and Pacific Film Archive (BAMPFA).

== Public collections ==
Her work is in various permanent art collections including the Oakland Museum of California, National Gallery of Art, Kemper Museum of Contemporary Art, San Francisco Museum of Modern Art, the Brooklyn Museum, the Smithsonian Institutions, the Baltimore Museum of Art, and the National Museum of Fine Arts, Santiago, Chile.
