= Hulleah Tsinhnahjinnie =

Navajo photographer, filmmaker, writer, curator and educator (born 1954)

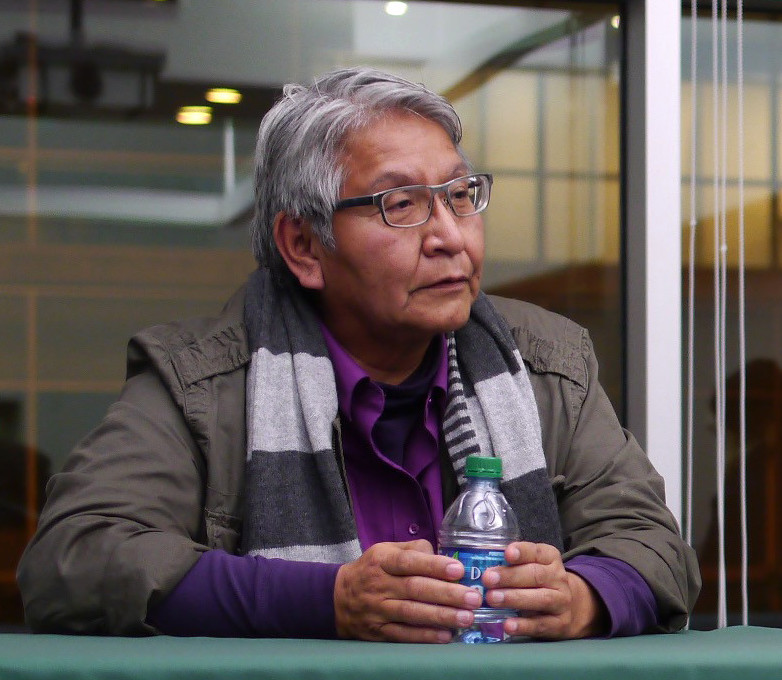
- Tsinhnahjinnie at a panel in 2015 in San Francisco, California
- Born: August 26, 1954 (age 72); Phoenix, Arizona, United States of America
- Education: Institute of American Indian Arts
- Alma mater: California College of the Arts; University of California, Irvine
- Occupations: photographer, museum director, curator, professor
- Employer(s): University of California, Davis, C.N. Gorman Museum
- Known for: photography, videography
- Works: Mattie Goes Traveling, Mattie Looks for Steven Biko, Grandma and Me, Aboriginal World View
- Awards: Eiteljorg Fellowship for Native American Fine Art, Chancellor's Fellowship at the University of California Irvine, First Peoples Community Artist Award, Rockefeller artist in residence
- Website: www.hulleah.com

Hulleah J. Tsinhnahjinnie (born 1954) is a Navajo Nation photographer, museum director, curator, and professor. She is living in Davis, California. She serves as the director of the Gorman Museum of Native American Art and teaches at University of California, Davis.

== Early life and education ==
Hulleah J. Tsinhnahjinnie, born into the Bear Clan (Taskigi) of the Seminole Nation and born for the Tsi'naajínii Clan of the Navajo Nation. Her mother, Minnie June Lee McGirt-Tsinhnahjinnie (1927–2016), was Seminole and Muskogee and her father, Andrew Van Tsinajinnie (1916–2000), was Navajo. Her father was a painter and muralist who studied at the Studio in Santa Fe, New Mexico. Tsinhnahjinnie was born in 1954 in Phoenix, Arizona. She grew up outside of Scottsdale; at age 13, she moved to the Navajo Reservation near Rough Rock. She is an enrolled citizen of the Navajo Nation.

In 1975, she began her art education at the Institute of American Indian Arts in Santa Fe. When she was age 23, Tsinhanahjinne moved to the San Francisco Bay Area for school. In 1978, Tsinhnahjinnie enrolled in the California College of Arts and Crafts (now California College of the Arts) in Oakland, where she earned a Bachelor of Fine Arts in painting with a photography minor in 1981.

She earned a Master of Fine Arts degree in Studio Arts from University of California, Irvine in 2002. During her time at Irvine she focused her work toward digital photos and videos. In that same year, she was awarded the First Peoples Fund Community Spirit Award.

She has self-identified as Two-Spirit.

== Career ==
She served as a board member for the Intertribal Friendship House, Oakland and the American Indian Contemporary Art Gallery in Oakland. Tsinhanahjinne chooses to display her art and passion through things like newsletters, posters, t-shirts, and photos. She taught her skill of photography and media to younger students.

Currently, Tsinhanahjinne works as a professor of Native American Studies at the University of California, Davis (UC Davis). While she has been working there she holds organized conferences that hold the purpose of bringing together native American photographers like herself to discuss topics such as "Visual Sovereignty". Along with being a professor for the university, Tsinhanahjinne is the Director of Gorman Museum of Native American Art at UC Davis.

== Artwork ==
Tsinhnahjinnie began her career as a painter, but "turned to photography as a weapon when her aesthetic/ethnic subjectivity came under fire." Her body of work "plays upon her own autobiography and what it means to be a Native American." Her work uses photography as a means to re-appropriate the Native American as subject. Although she is a photographer, Tsinhnahjinnie often hand-tints her photographs or uses them in collage. She has also used unusual supports for her work, such as car hoods. She shoots her own original photographs, but also frequently retools historical photographs of Native Americans to comment upon the ethnographic gaze of nineteenth-century white photographers. Tsinhnahjinnie also works in film and video.

"I have been photographing for thirty-five years, but the photographs I take are not for White people to look at Native people. I take photographs so that Native people can look at Native people. I make photographs for Native people."
–Hulleah Tsinhnahjinnie

Using a combination of photography and digital images with a contemporary Native American photography style, she overcomes stereotypes, challenges political ideas, and creates a space for other Natives to express their ideas as well. Her goal with her art is not aimed at the non-natives but instead it is to document her life experience and share it with the world. In a statement on "America Is a Stolen Land", Tsinhnahjinnie says, ".. the photographs I take are not for White people to look at Native people. I take photographs so Native people can look at Native people. I make photographs for Native people". The Damn Series which she wrote in 1977 is Tsinhnahjinnie's most widely known piece. Throughout the piece she works in Native knowledge (including humorous jokes) to repurpose images of Natives from colonialist history by shifting them back into a rightfully Indigenous context.

20 years later, in 1994, Tsinhnahjinnie created a series called "Memoirs of an Aboriginal Savant". She uses fifteen pages of an electronic diary to reflect on life with her family, politics, and other life experiences. The diary is all written with the idea in mind that she will take the viewer on a "journey to the center of an aboriginal mind without the fear of being confronted by the aboriginal herself". The book begins on the page "1954" (her birth year) and continues to look deeply into her personal life experiences. Through the book she writes herself from a first person point of view in order to convey herself how she sees herself instead of others views.

In many of her key works from the 1990s, Tsinhnahjinnie examined the notion of beauty. Her interest in this subject should be viewed in the context of the "return to beauty" that established itself in art historical discourse in the same period At the time, critics were addressing the taboos which had developed around beauty in Western art over the 20th century and the resurfacing of beauty towards the 1990s. While debated among scholars, these taboos were often characterized as a postmodernist reaction against the past notion of beauty as represented by a passive female body. Artists at the time were navigating a "return to beauty" that took these critiques of beauty into account.

Meanwhile, Tsinhnahjinnie was working from a cultural background where beauty had never been a taboo. She defined the beauty of women in terms of their empowerment, grounded in her own perspective as an Indigenous woman. Tsinhnahjinnie's collage When Did Dreams of White Buffalo Turn to Dreams of White Women? (1990) raises questions about Native women's internalized definitions of beauty. According to Lakota lore, White Buffalo Calf Woman was an exceptionally beautiful woman who introduced the pipe ceremony to the Lakota people. The title of this work addresses the historical shift from an indigenous definition of beauty before colonization, represented by White Buffalo Calf Woman, to a neocolonial one.

== Published writings ==
- Lidchi, Henrietta and Tsinhnahjinnie, H. J., eds. Visual Currencies: Native American Photography. Edinburgh: National Museums of Scotland, 2008.
- Tsinhnahjinnie, H. J. and Passalacqua, Veronica, eds. Our People, Our Land, Our Images: International Indigenous Photographers. Berkeley: Heyday Books, 2008. ISBN 978-1597140577.
- Tsinhnahjinnie, H. J. "Our People, Our Land, Our Images." Native Peoples Magazine. Nov/Dec. 2006
- Tsinhnahjinnie, H. J. "Native American Photography." The Oxford Companion to Photography Oxford: Oxford University Press, 2004
- Tsinhnahjinnie, H. J. "When is a Photograph Worth a Thousand Words?" Photography's Other Histories. C. Pinney and N. Peterson. Durham: Duke University Press, 2003: 40–52

== Exhibitions ==
=== Solo exhibitions ===
Solo exhibitions
| Year | Title | Location | Notes |
|---|---|---|---|
| 2010 | Kill the Man, Save the Indian | FotoArtFestival, Bielsko, Poland | |
| 1991 | Hulleah Tsinhnahjinnie | Campos Photography Center, Tonawanda, New York | Photography exhibition held in conjunction with artist residency at the Center for Exploratory and Perceptual Art in Buffalo, New York. |

=== Group exhibitions ===
Group exhibitions
| Year | Title | Location | Notes |
|---|---|---|---|
| 2018 | Seeds of Being: a Project of the Andrew W. Mellon Foundation Native American Art & Museum Studies Seminar | Fred Jones Jr. Museum of Art, Norman, Oklahoma | Exhibition featured 35 artworks from the James T. Bialac Native American Art Collection and the Rennard Strickland Collection; artists included Tsinhnahjinnie, as well as, Linda Lomahaftewa, T.C. Cannon, Fritz Scholder, Bob Haozous, Jeffrey Gibson, Tony Abeyta, Cannupa Hanska Luger, Amanda Lucario, among others. Accompanied by a published exhibition catalog. |
| 2012 | Native American Portraits: Points of Inquiry | Museum of Indian Arts and Culture, Santa Fe, New Mexico | |
| 2010 | Unfixed | CBK Center for Contemporary Art, Dordrecht, Netherlands | Accompanied by a published exhibition catalog. |
| 2006 | Holyland: Diaspora and the Desert | Heard Museum, Phoenix, Arizona | |
| 2003 | Hulleah Tsinhnahjinnie: Portraits Against Amnesia | Andrew Smith Gallery, Santa Fe, New Mexico | |
| 1998 | Native Nations: Journeys in American Photography | Barbican Art Gallery, London | Exhibition curated by Jane Alison. |
| 1996 | Image and Self in Contemporary Native American Photo Art | Dartmouth College, Hanover, New Hampshire | |
| 1994 | Watchful Eyes: Native American Women Artists | Heard Museum, Phoenix, Arizona | Theresa Harlan, guest curator. Accompanied by a published exhibition catalog. |
| 1994 | Traditions of Looking | Institute of American Indian Arts Museum, Santa Fe, New Mexico | |
| 1994 | Photographic Memoirs of an Indian Savant | Sacred Circle Gallery of American Indian Art, Seattle, Washington | |
| 1993 | Stand: Four Artists Interpret the Native American Experience | Edinboro University, Edinboro, Pennsylvania | |
| 1993 | Metro Bus Show | CEPA Gallery, Buffalo, New York | Exhibition was in conjunction with the International Cultural Festival, at the World University Games Buffalo '93. Each of the artists have created ten panels installed on the new natural gas buses and travelled the "Culture Tour" specialty bus line during the duration of the games, and July through October 1993. Participating artists included Tsinhnahjinnie, as well as, Patricia Deadman, Eric Gansworth, George Longfish, Jolene Rickard, Alan Jamieson, Jesse Cooday, and Shan Goshorn. |
| 1991 | Shared Visions: Native American Painters and Sculptors in the Twentieth Century | Heard Museum, Phoenix, Arizona | |
| 1991 | Composite Images | Berkeley Art Center, Berkeley, California | |
| 1990 | Artifacts for the Seventh Generation: Multi-Tribal, Multi-Media Visions: New Artistic Works by Eleven Native American Artists | American Indian Contemporary Arts, San Francisco, California | |
| 1990 | Talking Drum: Connected Vision | Koncepts Cultural Gallery, Oakland, California | |
| 1990 | It's All Relative: First & Second Generation Artists | American Indian Contemporary Arts, San Francisco, California | |
| 1990 | Language of the Lens: Contemporary Native American Photographers | Heard Museum, Phoenix, Arizona | |
| 1990 | Compensating Imbalances: Native American Photography | Sonoma State University, Rohnert Park, California | Traveling exhibition, with artists Pena Bonita, Phil Red Eagle, Larry McNeil, Camela Pappan, Carm Little Turtle, and Richard Ray Whitman. |
| 1988 | Compensating Imbalances: Native American Photography | American Indian Contemporary Arts, San Francisco, California | Traveling exhibition. |
| 1985 | Photographing Ourselves: Contemporary Native American Photography | American Indian Contemporary Arts, San Francisco, California | |
