= Brian Tripp =

Karuk artist and poet from California, U.S. (1945–2022)

Brian D. Tripp
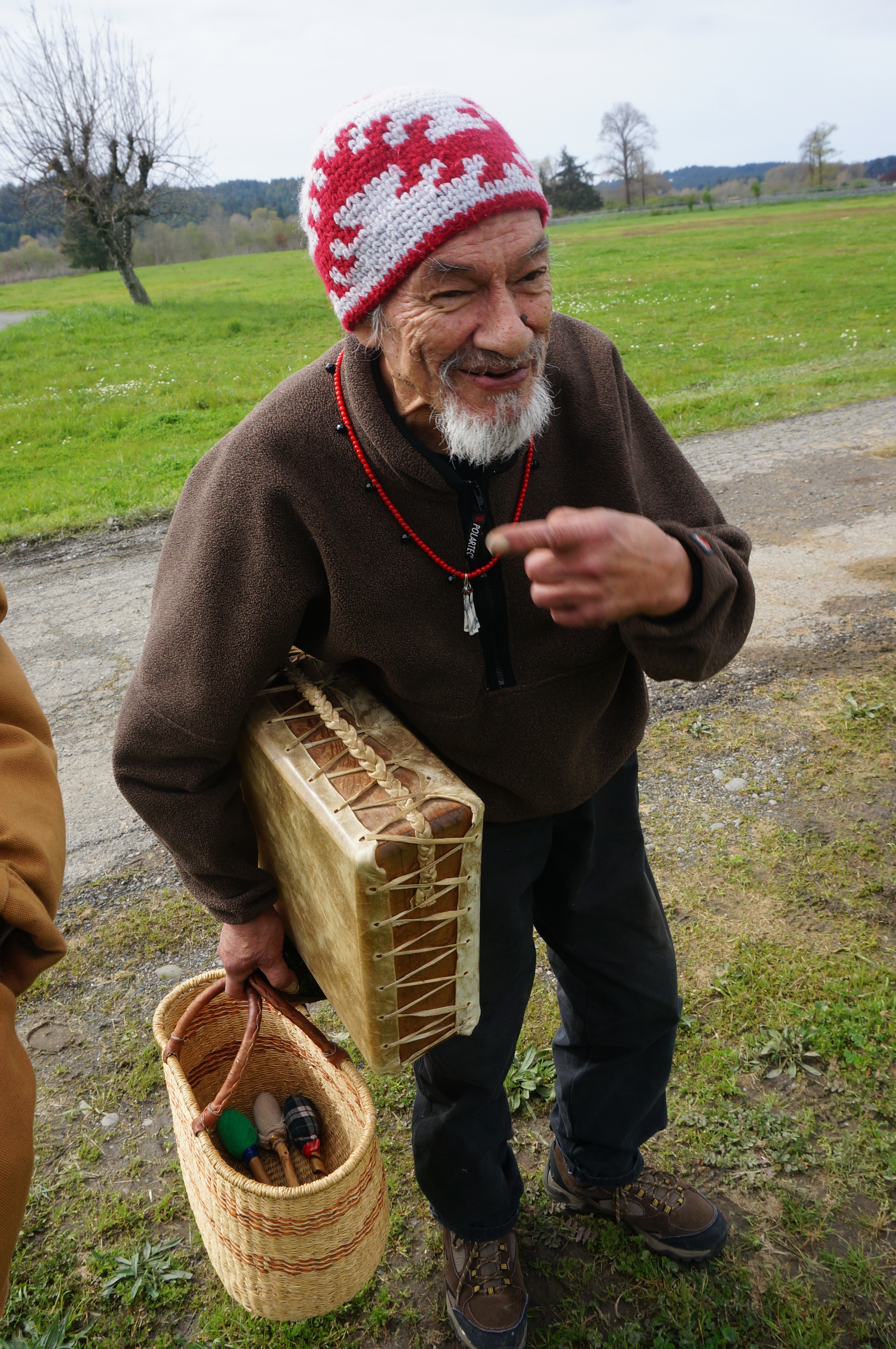
- Brian Tripp (Karuk) with drum and rattles, 2017
- Born: April 6, 1945; Eureka, California
- Died: May 13, 2022 (aged 77); California
- Citizenship: Karuk Tribe and American
- Education: Humboldt State University
- Known for: poetry, painting, sculpture
- Children: 1
- Awards: California Living Heritage Award; 2018

Brian D. Tripp (April 6, 1945 – May 13, 2022) was a visual artist, poet, and educator, and traditionalist and citizen of the Karuk Tribe from California.

His is known for his large-scale mixed-media assemblages, found-object sculptures, and paintings rooted in Karuk basket-design geometry and Native California cultural traditions. His work reflects his Karuk heritage, ceremonial life, and political engagement, often addressing Indigenous survival, memory, and resistance. He is also known for co-designing the memorial mural The Sun Set Twice on the People That Day now on display at the Clarke Museum, which commemorates the 1860 Wiyot massacre.

== Early life and education ==
Brian Tripp was a citizen of the Karuk Tribe, who was born in 1945 in Eureka, California, to Amos Tripp and Violet (Donahue) Tripp. He had three older brothers and grew up in the Klamath within Yurok country, with strong family ties to Karuk traditions and community life.

He often stayed with his grandmother, who taught him Karuk ways. As a child, he attended revived Karuk Brush Dances and grew up surrounded by ceremonial practices, songs, and basket-design symbolism that would later shape his artwork. Julian Lang described him as an “Ike’s Falls person,” emphasizing his deep connection to ancestral Karuk lands and responsibilities.

In 1963, he graduated from Del Norte High School, where he was voted “Most Talented” in recognition of his artistic abilities. He was drafted into the United States Army during the Vietnam War.

After returning from Vietnam, he enrolled at Humboldt State University (now California State Polytechnic University, Humboldt) in Arcata, California, where he majored in art. During this period, he began developing a visual language that combined Northwest Coast formline influences with Karuk basketry designs and large-scale mixed-media experimentation.

In 1973, Tripp married Dolly Kellogg, and they had a son in 1975.

Tripp later became active in restoring and supporting Native ceremonial spaces, including work for the Katimiin Brush Dance and the Yurok Jump Dance grounds at Pecwan.

== Artistic practice ==
Tripp developed a career as one of Northern California’s most significant Native contemporary artists, known for combining Karuk cultural traditions with large-scale mixed-media sculpture, painting, and found-object assemblage. His work often incorporated driftwood, river rocks, electrician’s tape, tin foil, rice paper, and salvaged materials, transforming everyday objects into powerful reflections on Indigenous survival, history, and spiritual responsibility. Mark Johnson described him as “one of California’s strongest artists,” noting that his work joined political force with the geometric traditions of Karuk and Northwest Coast basket design.

After studying art at Humboldt State University, Tripp became active as both an artist and educator. He taught Native art at the university and worked closely with Native communities throughout Northwestern California. His collaborations with these artists helped strengthen Native contemporary art movements in California.

Among his best-known works are Stand Our Ground This Time Around, Victims of Circumstance, and A Test of Faith, large-scale assemblages addressing Native identity, political struggle, and cultural endurance. In 2000, he co-designed the memorial mural The Sun Set Twice on the People That Day on Indian Island near Eureka, California, commemorating the 1860 Wiyot massacre. The mural serves as both a lament for those lost and a testament to Native survival and spiritual resilience.

His sculptures and paintings were exhibited widely in California and beyond, and his 1991–1992 solo exhibition at the Berkeley Store Gallery, published by Visibility Press, helped establish him as a major figure in Native American contemporary art. His work remains recognized for bridging tradition and experimentation while maintaining a strong commitment to Karuk community, land, and ceremony.

He signed many of his works with his initials BDT.

He lived and worked primarily in Northern California, where he remained an important figure in Native arts communities as an educator, mentor, and cultural leader. His work reflected not only personal artistic expression but also a lifelong commitment to Indigenous community life and historical remembrance. His work is in several public collections including that os the Gorman Museum of Native American Art and the Clarke Historical Museum.

== Teaching and writing ==
The Humboldt State University hired Tripp to teach a course in Native American art while he attended. He continued teaching the course off and on throughout the 1970s and 1980s. He worked for the Tri-County Indian Development Council's youth diversion program for several years. Frank Tuttle (Yuki/Wailaki/Konkow Maidu) published, wrote, and typeset the Tri-County newsletter.

== Curation ==
In 1974, Tripp helped to curate one of North Coasts's first American Indian group art exhibitions, In-Din-Art-I-Facts, which featured Frank LaPena(Nomtipom Wintu, 1937–2019), George Longfish (Seneca/Tuscarora), Harry Fonseca (Shingle Springs Miwok, 1946–2006), and Jean LaMarr (Susanville Rancheria/Northern Paiute/Achomawi).

== Cultural revitalization ==
Brian D. Tripp was deeply connected to Karuk ceremonial life and community responsibilities throughout his life. Raised in the Klamath River region, he maintained strong ties to Karuk traditions as a dancer, singer, and participant in ceremonies such as the Brush Dance. His identity as both an artist and ceremonial practitioner shaped much of his work, which often reflected themes of ancestral responsibility, land, healing, and cultural survival.

Tripp was also active in restoring ceremonial grounds and supporting Native cultural spaces, including work at Katimiin for the Brush Dance and at Pecwan for the Yurok Jump Dance. These efforts reflected his belief that art and ceremony were inseparable and part of a larger responsibility to “fix the Earth” and protect cultural continuity for future generations. Julian Lang emphasized that Tripp’s work was rooted not only in visual art but also in Karuk ceremonial life as a dancer and singer.

== Awards and honors ==
In 2018, the Alliance for California Traditional Arts presented him with the California Living Heritage Award.

== Death and legacy ==
Tripp died on May 13, 2022, at the age of 77. His legacy continues through his artwork, teaching, and contributions to Native California cultural preservation and contemporary Indigenous art.

== Selected exhibitions ==
Tripp exhibited widely from the 1980s through 2000s. His work showed in Californian museums such as the Crocker Art Museum and De Young Museum. He exhibited nationally in museums such as the New Museum in New York and the Heard Museum in Arizona. Then he showed internationally in Japan, Latvia, France, and Austria.

- 1974: Indian Art at the C.N. Gorman Museum (now the Gorman Museum of Native American Art), Davis, CA
- 1976: Brian Tripp at the C.N. Gorman Museum, Davis, CA
- 1976: New Horizons in American Indian Art, Southwest Museum of the American Indian, Los Angeles, CA
- 1981–82: Confluences of Tradition and Change: 24 American Indian Artists, traveling exhibition
- 1983–84: Innovations: New Expressions in Native American Painting, Heard Museum, Phoenix, AZ
- 1991–92: solo exhibition, Berkeley Store Gallery, Berkeley, CA
- 1996–97: Gifts of the Spirit, Works by Nineteenth-Century and Contemporary Native American Artists, Peabody Essex Museum, Salem, MA
- 1997: Of This Time, from This Place, Cecile Moochnek Gallery, Berkeley, CA
- 2019–20: When I Remember I See Red: American Indian Art and Activism in California, traveling exhibition organized by the Crocker Art Museum, Sacramento, CA
- 2025: The Art of Judith Lowry, Nevada Museum of Art, Reno, NV
