= The Responsibility of Raising a Child =

Sculpture in Portland, Oregon, U.S.

- The sculpture in 2015
- Artist: Rick Bartow
- Type: Sculpture
- Medium: Bronze
- Location: Portland, Oregon, United States; 45.51750°N 122.67812°W

The Responsibility of Raising a Child, also known as From the Mad River to the Little Salmon River, or The Responsibility of Raising a Child, is an outdoor 2004 bronze sculpture by Native American artist Rick Bartow, located in Portland, Oregon, United States.

== Description and history ==
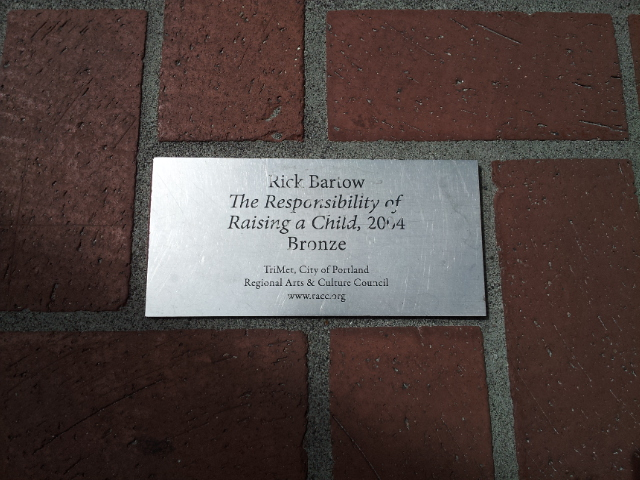
Plaque for the sculpture

The Responsibility of Raising a Child was designed by Rick Bartow in 2004, cast in 2009, and completed in 2010 before being installed at the intersection of Southwest 5th Avenue and Taylor Street in the Portland Transit Mall. Cascade Fine Arts Foundry, based in Damascus, Oregon, served as the sculpture's foundry. The sculpture depicts several animals and objects being carried on the back of a coyote ("the trickster"), including a grandmother mask with a tattoo that Bartow's mother observed on the face of an elder healing woman in Siletz, Oregon, a pair of salmon, a Pacific lamprey eel feeds, a basket holding a baby (Bartow's daughter), and several birds, including a killdeer, an eagle with outstretched wings, and a raven. A moon mask on the eagle's tail symbolizes women, and a sun mark on its wing represents men.

== See also ==
- 2004 in art
