= George Hart Hall =

- Animal Science Building
- U.S. National Register of Historic Places
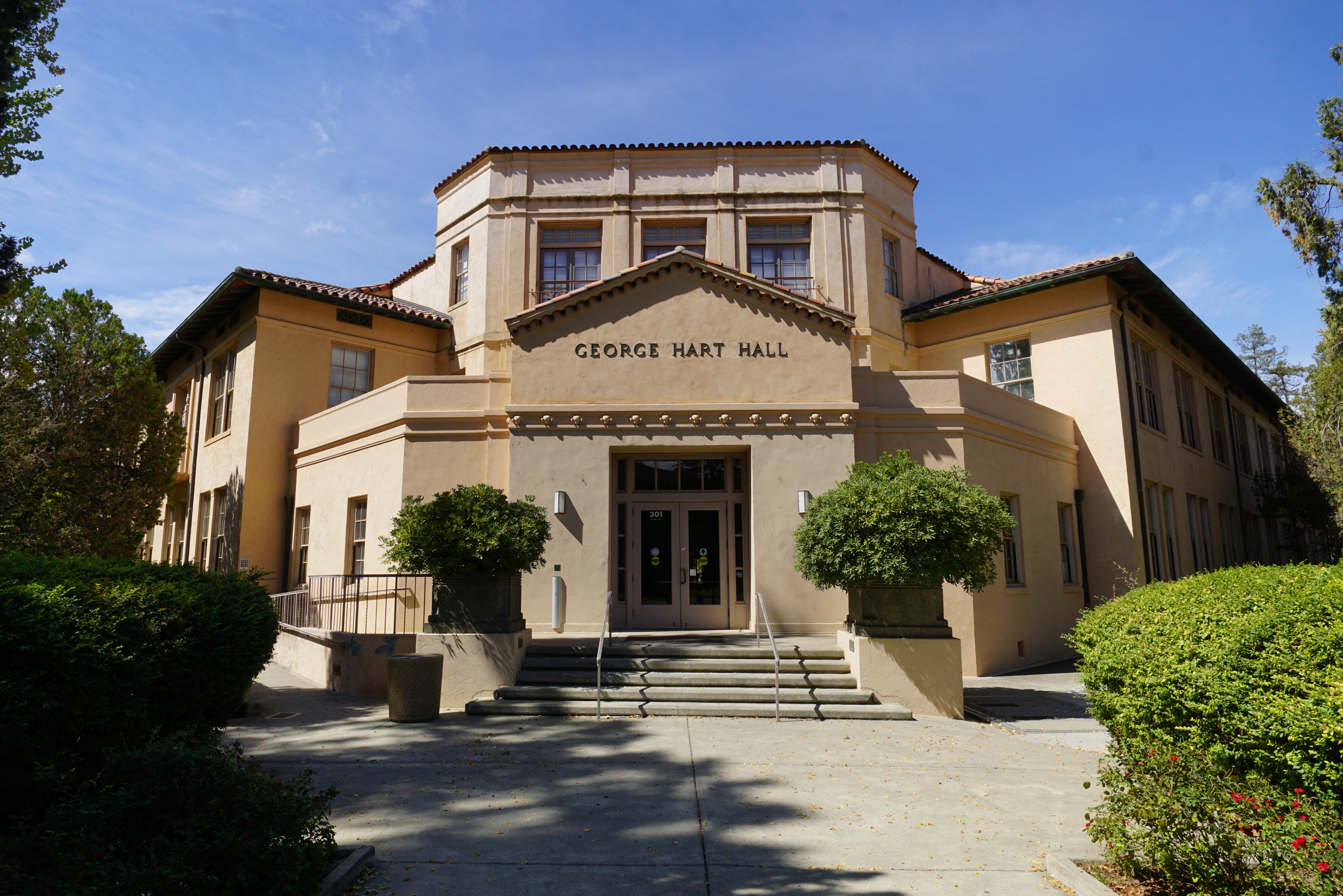
- Main entrance of Hart Hall

- Location within California
- Location: 301 Shields Ave, Davis, California
- Coordinates: 38°32′27″N 121°45′00″W
- Area: 2.2 acres (0.89 ha)
- Built: 1928
- Architect: Hays, William Charles
- Architectural style: Mission/Spanish Revival
- Restored: 1992
- NRHP reference No.: 86001354
- Added to NRHP: June 17, 1986

George Hart Hall, originally the Animal Science Building, is an academic building in the University of California, Davis. It is one of the oldest buildings at UC Davis, and is listed on the National Register of Historic Places. Originally made for the Department of Animal Science, it now houses various humanities departments.

== History ==
UC Davis was originally established in 1905 as the University Farm for the University of California, focusing primarily on teaching known agricultural methods for practical purposes. In 1926, Dr. George H. Hart was appointed head of the Division of Animal Husbandry, where he shifted the focus of the University to agricultural research. Hart recognized that a larger building was required for his plans of a research based Animal Husbandry department, and in 1928 the Animal Science Building was built by the K. E. Parker Company.

The building was designed by William Charles Hays, the supervising architect for the Davis campus in a Spanish Revival style. It is a roughly U-Shaped "pinkish-beige" building made of reinforced concrete, and is located on a corner of the UC Davis Quad.

In 1983, the building was renamed to George Hart Hall.

In 1985, an application prepared by Robin Elisabeth Datel was filed to include the building on the National Register of Historic Places. Despite objections from then chancellor James H. Meyer, the building was listed on June 17, 1986.

In 1992, Hart Hall finished an $8.9 million renovation to prepare for it being used by social science programs.

Since the relocation of the Animal Science department, Hart Hall has housed various humanities departments, as well as the Gorman Museum of Native American Art from 1992 until moving to a new location in 2023.
