= Carl Nelson Gorman =

Navajo code talker, artist, and professor (1907–1998)

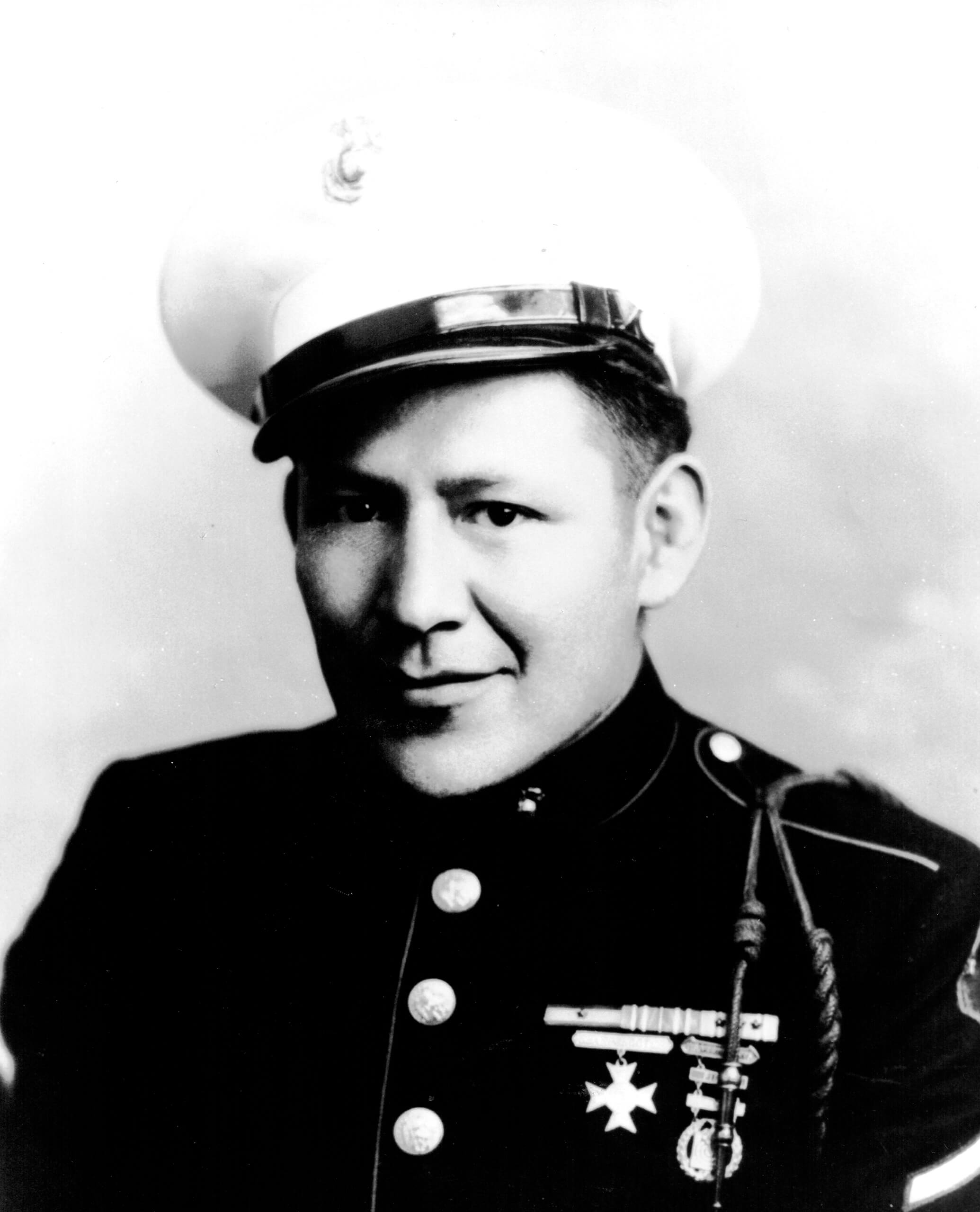
- Gorman in his uniform (between 1943 and 1945)
- Born: Kin-Ya-Onny-Beyeh; October 5, 1907; Chinle, Arizona, U.S.
- Died: January 29, 1998 (aged 90); Gallup, New Mexico, U.S.
- Resting place: Family Cemeteries, Apache County, Arizona, U.S.
- Monuments: C.N. Gorman Museum (1973) at University of California, Davis
- Other name: Carl Gorman
- Education: Otis College of Art and Design
- Occupations: code talker, soldier, painter, illustrator, printmaker, professor, healer
- Spouses: Adelle Katherine Brown (div. 1944), Mary Excie Wilson (m. 1956)
- Children: 5, including R.C. Gorman
- Website: www.carlngorman.com

Signature
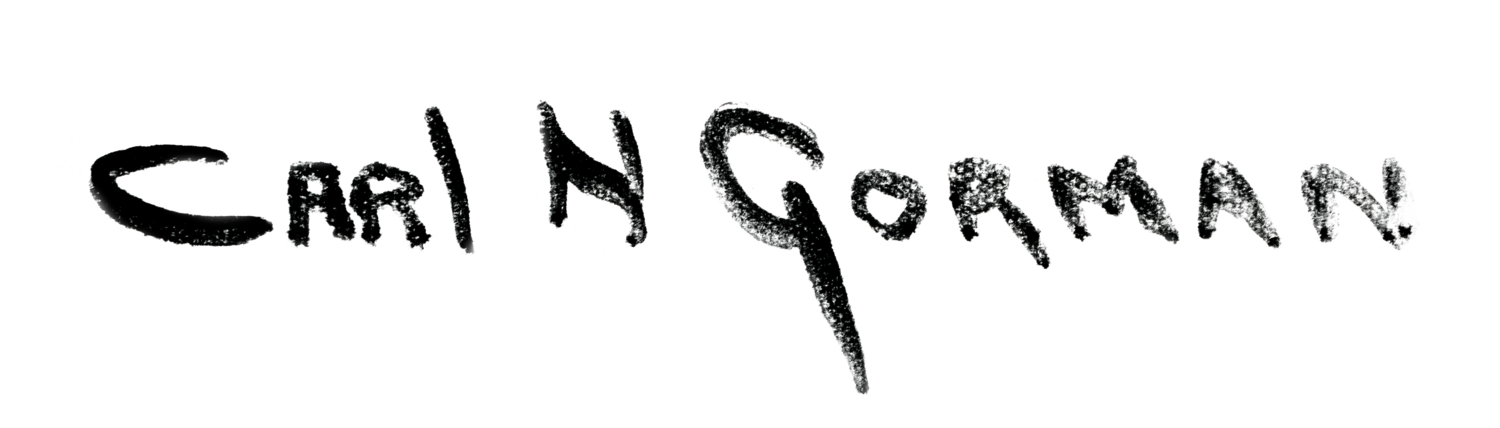

Carl Nelson Gorman (October 5, 1907 – January 29, 1998), also known as Kin-Ya-Onny-Beyeh, was a Navajo code talker, visual artist, painter, illustrator, and professor. He was on the faculty at the University of California, Davis, from 1950 until 1973. During World War II, Gorman served as a code talker with the United States Marine Corps in the Pacific.

== Early life and education ==
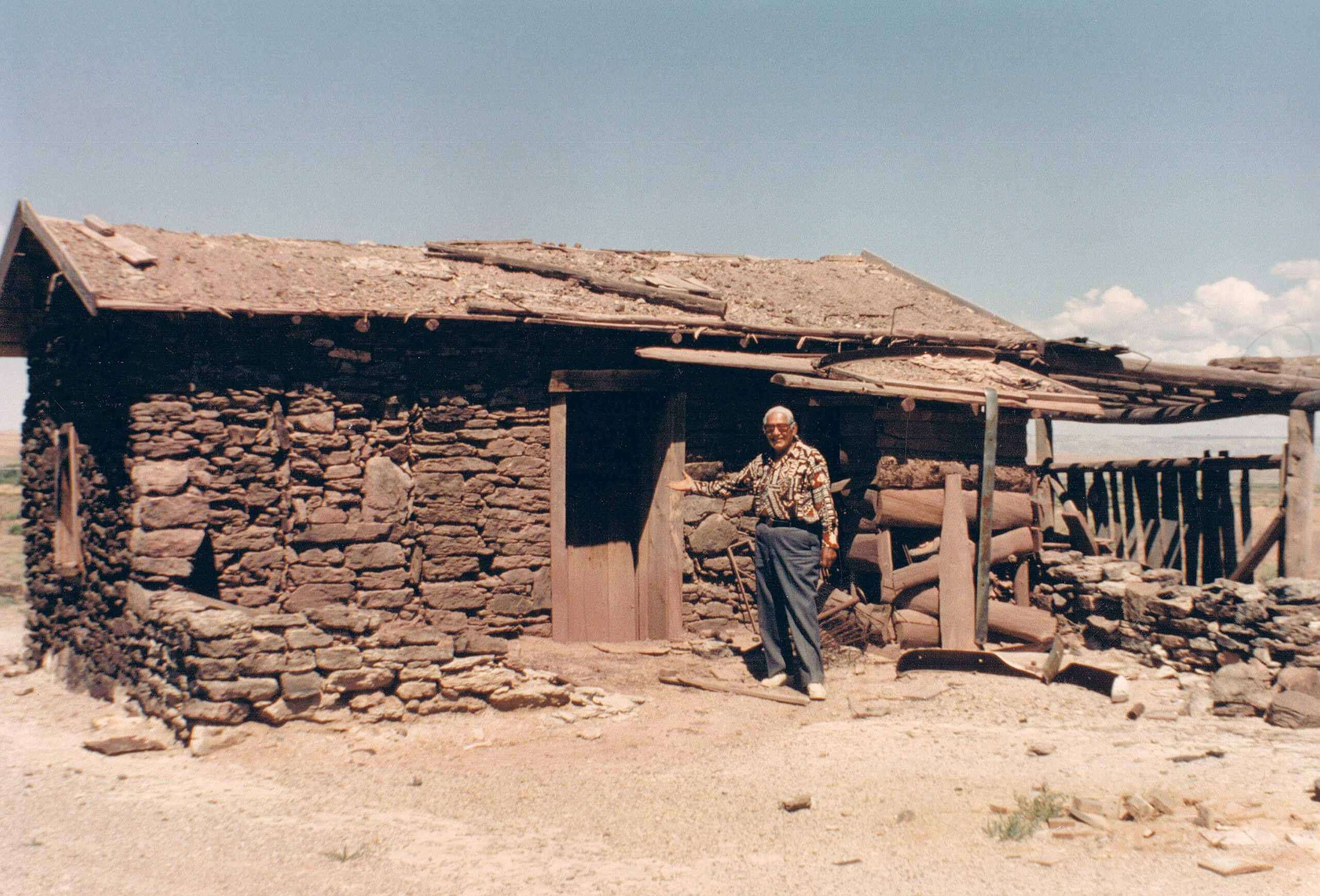
Gorman (1985) stands outside the house in which he was born in 1907 in Chinle, Arizona

Carl Nelson Gorman was born on October 5, 1907, in Chinle, Arizona. Chinle is located on the rim of the Canyon de Chelly National Monument. He was a member of the Dibeh Łizhin clan (the Black Sheep Clan) and born for the Khinyá' áni clan (the Towering House People). His father was a cattleman and "Indian trader". When he was a child, his mother Alice, who was a traditional weaver, supported his earliest artistic pursuits. His mother also worked to translate hymns from English into Navajo. His parents gave a portion of their land to found the First Presbyterian Mission in Chinle. Gorman's western education began at the Rehoboth Mission School in Rehoboth, New Mexico; an American Indian boarding school where he was punished for speaking the Navajo language. His father removed him from the school and enrolled him in the Albuquerque Indian School in Albuquerque, New Mexico where he excelled at sports including boxing and football.

== Career ==
In April 1942, Gorman was one of 29 Navajo men recruited by the United States Marine Corps to create a code based on the Navajo language. The Navajo code talkers fought and deployed the code in every campaign from Guadalcanal through the Occupation of Japan. Gorman served in four campaigns: Guadalcanal, Saipan, Tinian, and Tarawa. The Navajo code was formally developed and modeled on the Joint Army/Navy Phonetic Alphabet that uses agreed-upon English words to represent letters or other meanings. The Japanese were never able to crack the Navajo-based encryption. In 1945, Gorman was honorably discharged as Private First Class.

After the war, Gorman studied art at the Otis Art Institute (now Otis College of Art and Design), on the G.I. Bill. In 1949, Gorman was working as an illustrator in Los Angeles, including technical illustration work for Douglas Aircraft Company.

In 1950, he joined the faculty at UC Davis, where he remained until 1973. Gorman helped in the formation of the Native American Studies Department, as well as in the creation of a Native American art studio workshop. In 1969, the Native American Studies Department at UC Davis was formed under the name Tehcumseh Center, Gorman was one of the first faculty working alongside Jack D. Forbes, and David Risling, Jr. Sarah V. Hutchison joined the faculty in 1970, and George Longfish joined in 1973.

Gorman used traditional Navajo motifs in his visual art practice.

Around 1973, Gorman and his wife Mary moved to Gallup, New Mexico where he worked on many community-based projects; including directing the Navajo Arts and Crafts Guild, he founded the Navajo Code Talkers Association, worked on an oral history project with Navajo elders, and taught classes at both Navajo Community College (now Diné College) and University of New Mexico-Gallup.

=== Significant dates in art career ===
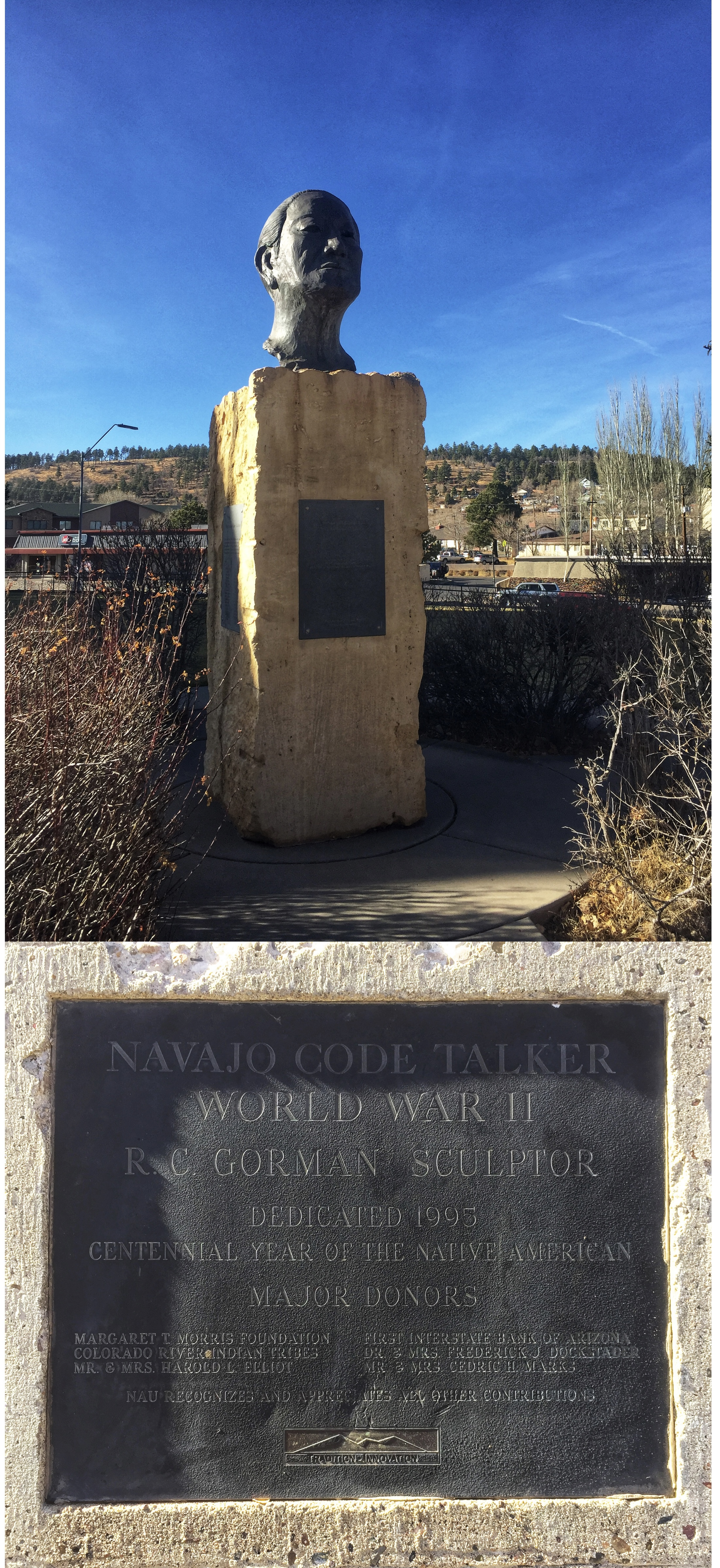
Navajo Code Talker, by R.C. Gorman at the Northern Arizona University Campus in Flagstaff, AZ. Based a small edition sculpture created by Gorman in 1978 and enlarged for the NAU campus in 1995.

- 1964 - Carl and his son R.C. Gorman are invited to do a two-person show, "New Directions in American Indian Art", at the Philbrook Art Center in Tulsa, OK.
- 1965 - Carl and R.C. exhibit together at the Heard Museum's Gallery of Indian Art in Phoenix, Arizona. John Becklaw, rights a review in the Arizona Republic under the headline: "Gormans-Father and Son Rebels in Indian Art"
- 1968 - Carl loans his son, R.C. Gorman some money to purchase the Manchester Gallery in Taos, NM. R.C. renames it the Navajo Gallery. It is the first Native American owned fine art gallery.
- 1990 - Gorman was awarded a doctor of humane letters from University of New Mexico.
- 2020 - Carl's work is featured in the Smithsonian Magazine's November issue under the heading "The Remarkable and Complex Legacy of Native American Military Service".

=== Significant dates in military career ===
- 1941 - May 4. Carl and 28 other Navajos are sworn into the Marine Corps. They are transported by bus to MCRD San Diego and designated Platoon 382 - the first "all Indian, all Navajo" Platoon in Marine Corps history.
- 1944 - PFC Gorman is photographed while serving on Saipan. He and a fellow code talker are injured while on litter duty when a mortar shell explodes near them.
- 1945 - PFC Gorman is Honorably discharged from the Marine Corps out of a Marine base in Oregon. Awards and Decorations include: Marine Good Conduct Medal, American Campaign Medal, Asiatic–Pacific Campaign Medal, World War II Victory Medal, Marksman Badge with Sharpshooter tab
- 1968 - The Navajo Code is declassified.
- 1973 - Carl Gorman is elected president of the Navajo Code Talkers' Association
- 2000 - Senator Jeff Bingaman sponsors the Honoring Navajo Code Talkers Act
- 2001 - Carl's widow, Mary E. Gorman (Wilson) accepts a Congressional Medal from Pres. George W. Bush on behalf of Carl.

== Death, honors, and legacy ==
Gorman died from cancer on January 29, 1998, in Gallup, New Mexico. His son R.C. Gorman (1931–2005) was a renowned Navajo artist. His daughter Zonnie Gorman is a noted historian of Navajo Code Talkers. His son Alfred Kee Gorman (1957–1966) also was an artist, but he died at an early age.

In 1990, Gorman was awarded a doctor of humane letters from the University of New Mexico.

Shortly after his retirement in 1973, UC Davis named their new museum, the C.N. Gorman Museum in his honor, and Gorman donated to the collection. In 1995, Northern Arizona University unveiled a code talker monument, a bust of Gorman sculpted by his son, R.C. Gorman.

=== Museum collections and exhibitions ===
His artwork is included in the permanent museum collections of the C.N. Gorman Museum, the Brooklyn Museum, and the National Museum of the American Indian.

In addition to the many public and private collections of Gorman's work, the Gorman Family has an extensive collection of his artworks, notes, and other ephemera. The Michael Gorman Gallery in Taos, New Mexico, regularly includes rare artwork by the late Carl N. Gorman.

== See also ==
- Adee Dodge
