= Gorman Museum of Native American Art =

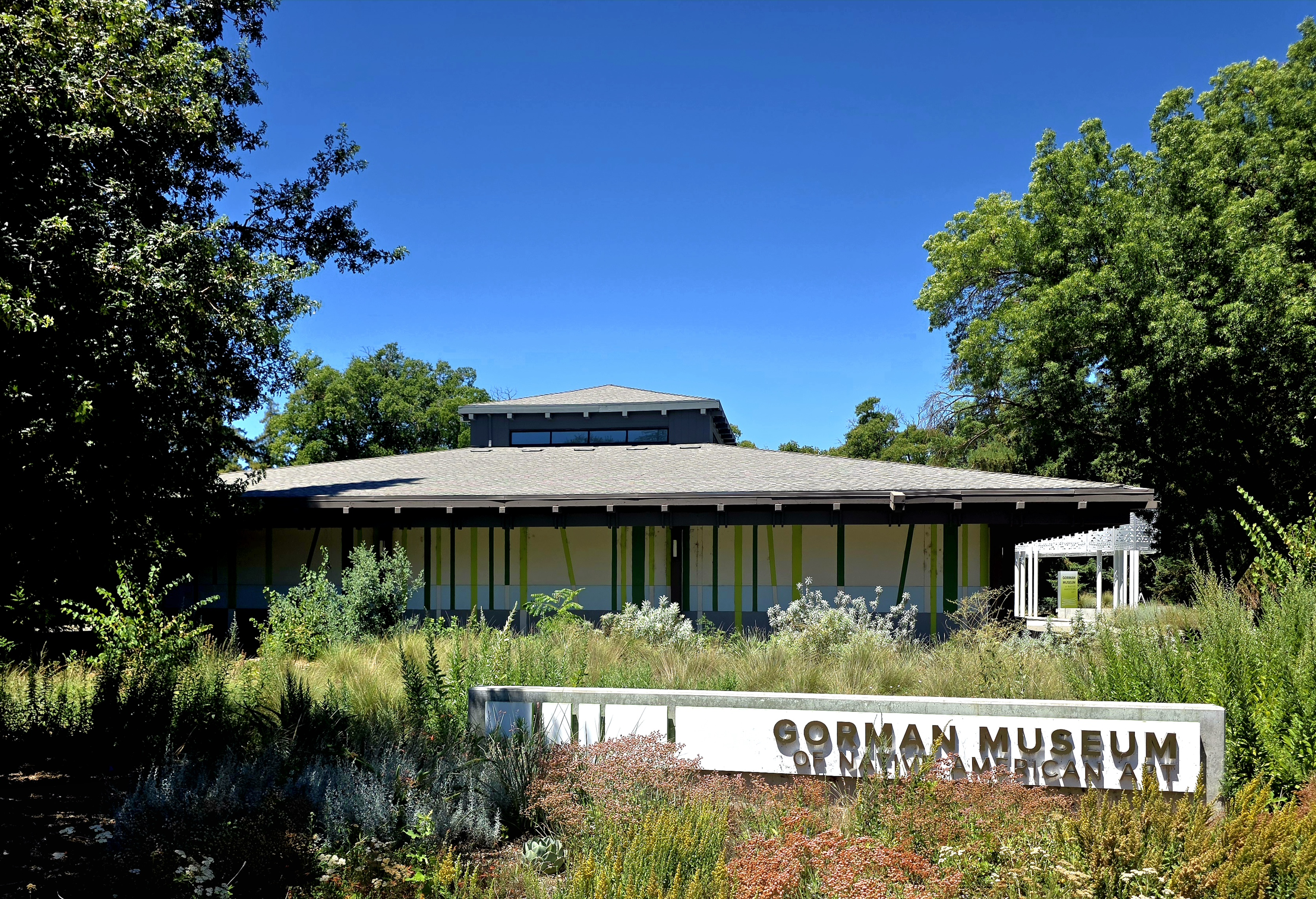
- Former name: Carl Nelson Gorman Museum, C.N. Gorman Museum
- Established: 1973; 53 years ago
- Location: University of California, Davis, 181 Old Davis Road, Davis, California, U.S.
- Coordinates: 38.537691°N 121.746555°W
- Type: art museum
- Collections: Native American
- Collection size: 2,250+
- Director: Hulleah J. Tsinhnahjinnie
- Curator: Veronica Passalacqua
- Website: gormanmuseum.ucdavis.edu

Gorman Museum of Native American Art is a museum focused on contemporary Native American and Indigenous artists, founded in 1973 at University of California, Davis (UC Davis) in Davis, California. It was formerly known as the Carl Nelson Gorman Museum, and the C.N. Gorman Museum. The museum moved to a new location in 2023.

== History ==
The Gorman Museum of Native American Art was founded in 1973 by the Department of Native American Studies at UC Davis. The name of the museum is in honor of Carl Nelson Gorman, the Navajo code talker, artist, and a former faculty member at UC Davis.

=== Collection ===
In 2015, the museum held a collection of 860 objects by 250 artists. By 2023, the museum collection had grown to over 2,250 works, with about one third of the collection coming directly from artist donations. Artists in the museum collection include Frank LaPena, Jaune Quick-to-See Smith, Melanie Yazzie, Rick Bartow, Benjamin Haldane, James Schoppert, Dana Claxton, Frank Tuttle, Garnet Pavatea and Brian D. Tripp. and many others.

=== Leadership ===
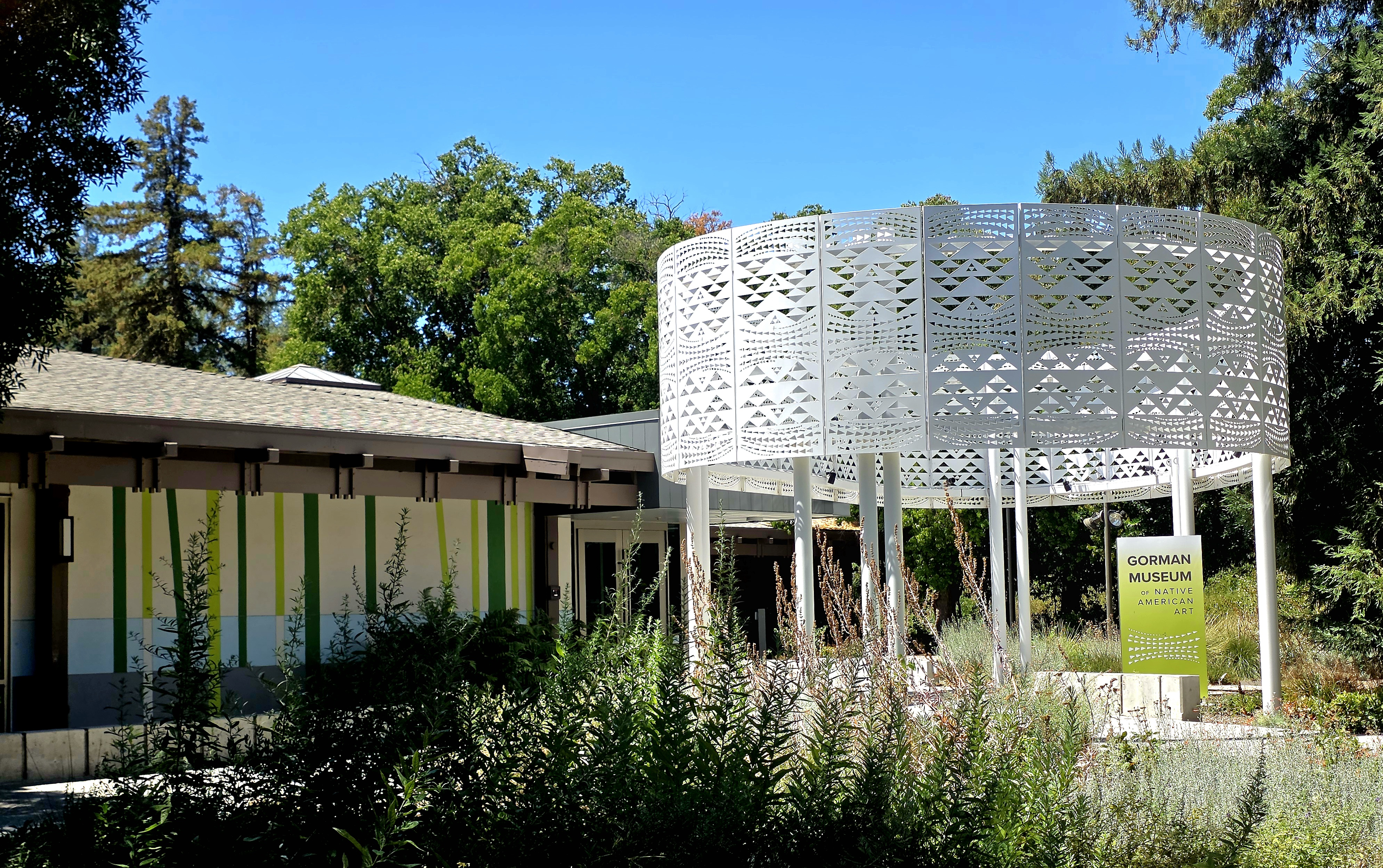
Gorman Museum entry pavilion

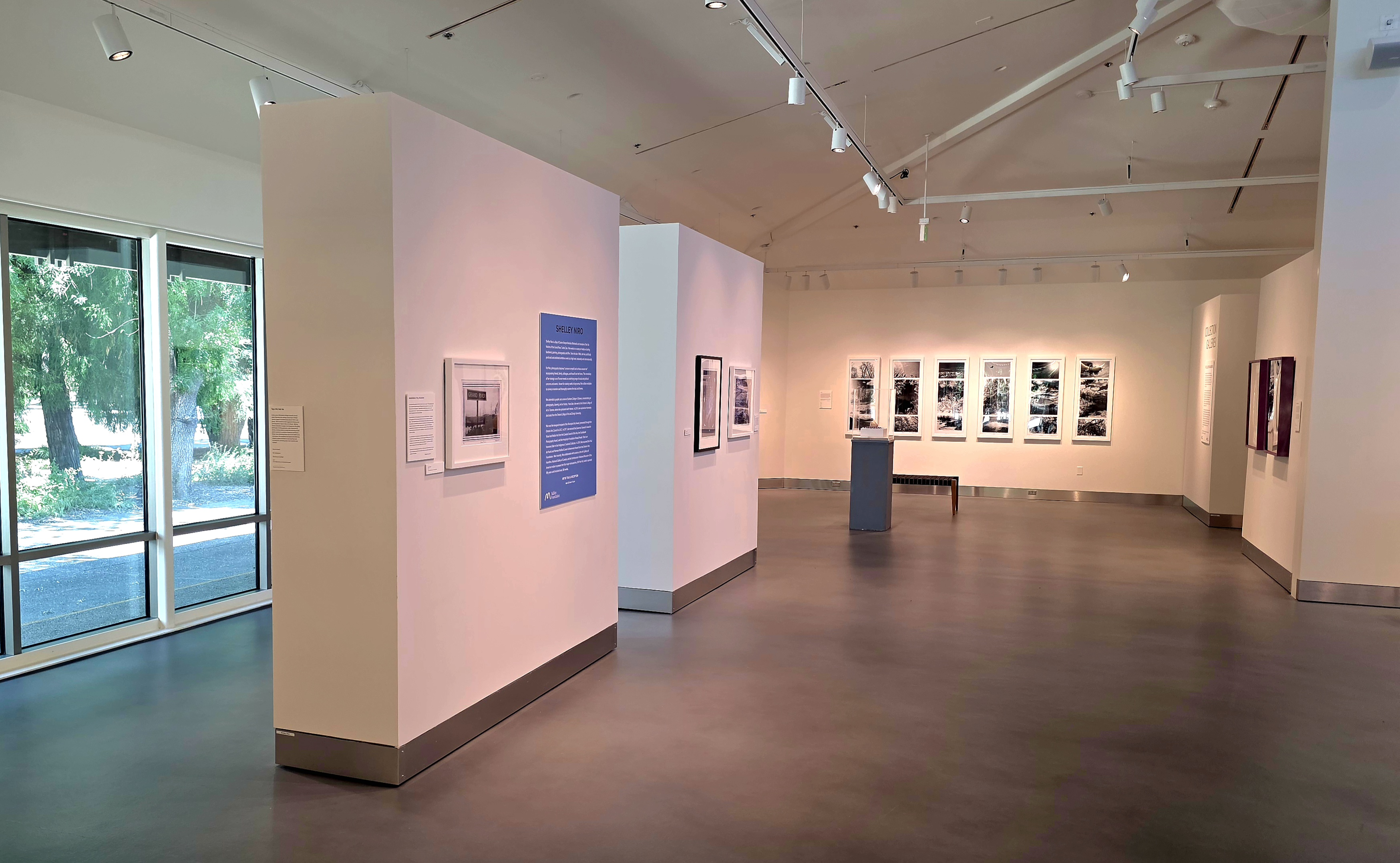
Gorman Museum gallery space

Hulleah J. Tsinhnahjinnie presently serves as faculty director of the museum, which started in 2004. Veronica Passalacqua presently serves as executive director, previously curator, since 2004.

George Longfish served as the museum founding director and curator, from 1974 to 1996. Following Longfish, Theresa Harlan succeeded as director and curator, from 1996 to 2000.

=== Building ===
The museum was formerly located at 1316 Hart Hall, from 1992 until 2020. In 2020–2021, the museum was in the process of expanding and relocating to the former Richard L. Nelson Gallery (which closed in 2015) in Nelson Hall on campus.

In September 2023, the museum reopened at 181 Old Davis Road on the 50th anniversary of the museum's founding. The new location has nearly four times the exhibition space, and features an entry pavilion with a "large, circular public artwork based upon Native American basketry designs" that was created by the museum director Tsinhnahjinnie.

== See also ==
- Manetti Shrem Museum of Art
- California State Indian Museum
