= Garnet Pavatea =

Hopi-Tewa potter (1915–1981)

- Born: 1915; Hano, Arizona, U.S.
- Died: 1981 (aged 65–66)

Garnet Pavatea (also known as Flower Girl) (1915–1981) was a Hopi-Tewa potter.

== Early life and education ==
She was born in Hano, near First Mesa, Arizona to a Tewa mother and Hopi father. Her father, Duwakaku (c. 1865–1956), was a silversmith.

== Career ==
She began making pottery in the 1940s. She worked with red clay, as well as black and red slip. Her bowls often had triangular indentations around the rims.

She often demonstrated her creative process for visitors at the Museum of Northern Arizona. Her work is held at several museums worldwide, including the National Museum of the American Indian, the University of Michigan Museum of Art, the C.N. Gorman Museum,, the Yager Museum of Art & Culture, and the Museum of the Red River.

== Personal life ==
She was married to Womak Pavatea, and had a daughter, Wilma Rose Pavatea, who also created pottery.
