= Adee Dodge =

Navajo artist (1912–1992)

- Hashke-yil-e-dale
- Born: Adolph Bittany Dodge; November 16, 1912; Fort Defiance, Apache County, Arizona, U.S.
- Died: January 4, 1992 (aged 79); Albuquerque, New Mexico, U.S.
- Other name: Adee Bittany Dodge
- Education: Bacone College, Hogan School; University of New Mexico, Columbia University
- Occupations: Artist, linguist, Navajo code talker
- Known for: Painting

Adee Dodge (1912–1992) or Hashke-yil-e-dale, was an American Navajo artist, linguist, and Navajo code talker. He was best known for his paintings of horses, and documenting other aspects of Navajo culture in his paintings. Dodge served in the United States military in the South Pacific during World War II.

== Biography ==
Adee Dodge was the son of Bitanny Dodge, and grandson of Chee Dodge, the last official Head Chief of the Navajo Tribe and the first Navajo Tribal Chairman.

He attended Bacone College; the University of New Mexico where he received a bachelor's degree in Anthropology (1933); and a master's degree in Comparative Linguistics and Anthropology (1935), at Columbia University. In 1934, he studied at the Hogan School, focusing on Navajo orthography and linguistics, under linguist Gladys Reichard. While in school he briefly worked as a Navajo language consultant to Reichard.

During World War II, he served for 4 years in the South Pacific as a Navajo code talker. He was injured during his military service and while he was recuperating he started documenting Navajo culture in drawings and paintings, such as ceremonial songs and religious traditions.

In 1943, Dodge had married Effie Jean Casey; and later in 1950, he married Veah Pillsbury. He had one daughter.

By 1954, he was actively working as a painter. He became known for his paintings of stylized blue horses and illustrations of Navajo myths. In the 1950s, he also explored uranium mining and founded Adee Dodge Enterprises, Inc.

He died on January 4, 1992, in Albuquerque, New Mexico.

== See also ==
- Carl Nelson Gorman
