= Rick Bartow =

Native American artist

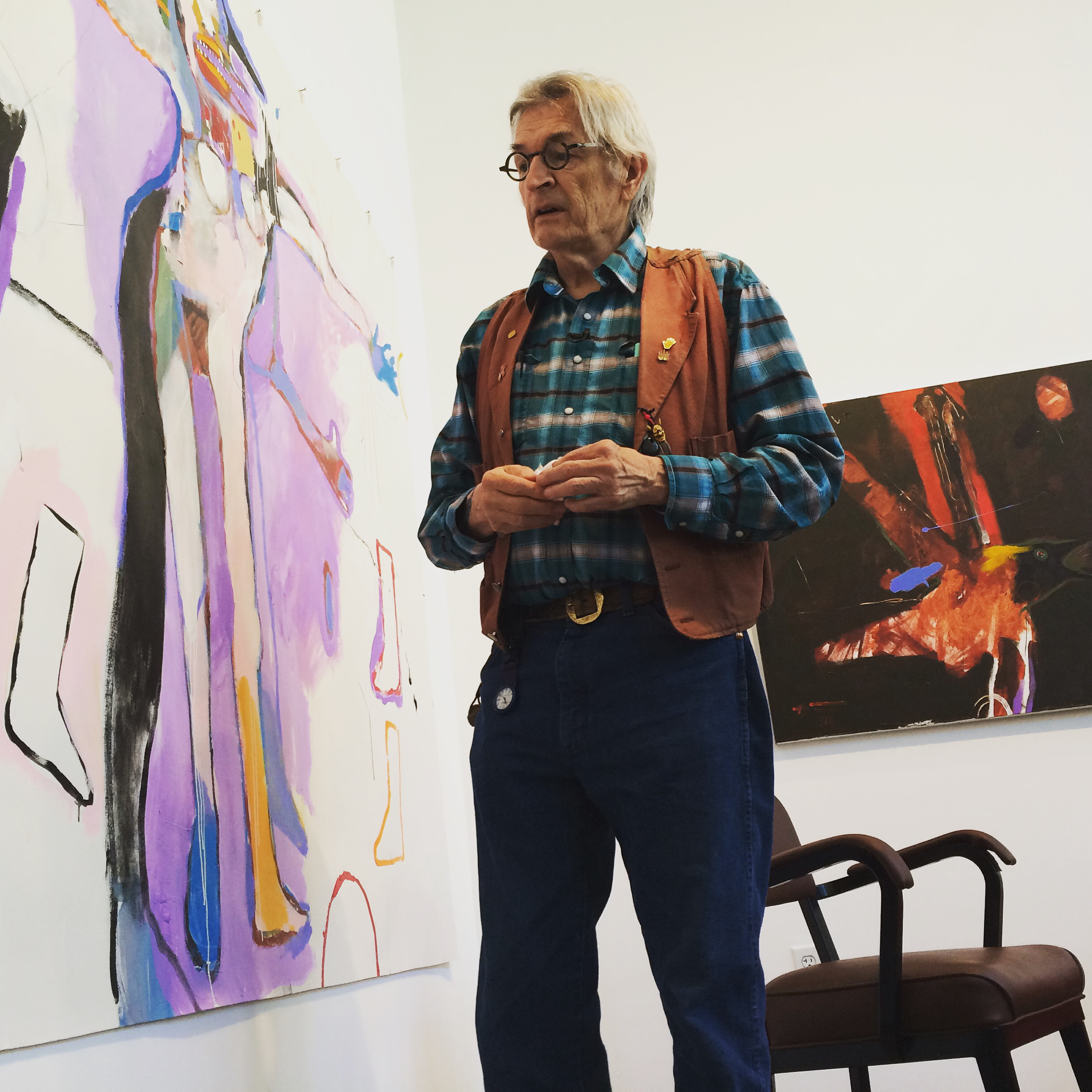
- Born: Richard Elmer Bartow; December 16, 1946; Newport, Oregon
- Died: April 2, 2016 (aged 69); Oregon
- Citizenship: Wiyot Tribe and American
- Education: Western Oregon University
- Known for: sculpture, painting, printmaking
- Notable work: We Were Always Here; The Responsibility of Raising a Child

Richard Elmer "Rick" Bartow (December 16, 1946 – April 2, 2016) was a Native American artist from Oregon.

He was a citizen of the Wiyot Tribe and a member of the Mad River band, who are Indigenous to Humboldt County, California. He primarily created pastel, graphite, and mixed media drawings, wood sculpture, acrylic paintings, drypoint etchings, monotypes, and a small number of ceramic works.

== Early life ==
Richard Elmer Bartow was born in Newport, Oregon, on December 16, 1946, to Mabel and Richard Bartow. His father's family was of the Mad River band of Wiyot. In Oregon, the family developed close ties with the local Siletz Indian community. When Rick was five, his father died. His non-Indian mother then married Andrew Mekemson, whom Bartow considered to be a beloved second father. Bartow became interested in art at an early age, encouraged by his aunt Amy Bartow, who studied art and art education at the University of Washington. His love for art continued through high school and extended to music when he took up the guitar and bongos.

== Personal life ==
Bartow attended Western Oregon University and graduated in 1969 with a degree in secondary art education. In 1969, he was drafted into the army and sent to Vietnam. He served in the Vietnam War from 1969 to 1971 as a teletype operator and as a musician in a military hospital, for which he was awarded the Bronze Star.

== Art career ==
Buck (2015), Smithsonian American Art Museum, on loan from the Jordan Schnitzer Museum of Art

After several small shows in the Newport area, Rick Bartow was offered a solo exhibition in 1985 by William Jamison of Jamison/Thomas Gallery, who operated galleries in Portland, Oregon, and New York City. Bartow exhibited frequently at both locations and elsewhere, and his work began to garner national attention. Following Jamison's death in 1995 and his galleries' subsequent closures, Bartow signed on with Charles Froelick of Froelick Gallery in Portland, and a fruitful 20-year professional relationship and friendship followed.

Bartow's carving The Cedar Mill Pole was displayed in the Jacqueline Kennedy Garden at the White House in 1997; it had been designated one of the most highly regarded Native American public sculptures in the country. The pole was partially inspired by Bartow's work with the Māori artist John Bevan Ford. Presented as a gift to the Portland, Oregon metropolitan community from Oregon's Washington County and the Oregon College of Art and Craft, it was intended to help heal the controversy that surrounded an urban development project. The 26-foot-tall carving was created using one of the giant cedars that were removed for a road project.

The Smithsonian's National Museum of the American Indian commissioned Bartow's monumental cedar sculptures We Were Always Here, which sit on the northwest corner of the museum overlooking the National Mall. Dedicated on the autumnal equinox, September 21, 2012, the towering works represent a pinnacle of Bartow's accomplishments. Of these sculptures, Bartow stated "The Welcoming Bear and Raven, Healer and Rascal sit atop the sculpture poles; one, slow and methodical, fiercely protective of her children, the other a playful, foible-filled teacher of great power. Both Bear and Raven are focused on water and salmon for serious reasons. The salmon reflect the health of the environment, in particular water, the source of all life. On each pole are repeated lower horizontal patterns that symbolize successive waves, generations following generations, an accumulation of wisdom and knowledge. The tree used for the sculptures is approximately 500 years old. The elders say that the power of the sun is stored within the tree. Essentially the tree embodies the fundamental elements of Earth, Air, Fire, and Water, our sacred and precious natural resources."

As for influences, Bartow cited Marc Chagall, Francis Bacon, Odilon Redon and Horst Janssen, in addition to his Native American heritage and his work with the Māori. These artists also worked expressionistically with human and animal forms.

== Exhibitions ==
In April 2015, the Jordan Schnitzer Museum of Art at the University of Oregon opened "Things You Know but Cannot Explain", a major retrospective exhibition of Rick Bartow's works in many media, spanning 35 years of his career as an artist. Venues for its 2015–19 run are the Gilcrease Museum in Tulsa, Oklahoma; North Dakota Museum Of Art in Grand Forks, North Dakota; IAIA Museum of Contemporary Native Arts in Santa Fe, New Mexico; the Heard Museum in Phoenix, Arizona; Washington State University in Pullman, Washington; The Boise Art Museum in Boise, Idaho; the Schingoethe Center of Aurora University in Aurora, Illinois; the Autry Museum of the American West in Los Angeles, California; the High Desert Museum in Bend, Oregon; and the C.N. Gorman Museum at UC Davis in Davis, California.

Bartow's work was part of Stretching the Canvas: Eight Decades of Native Painting (2019–2021), a survey at the National Museum of the American Indian George Gustav Heye Center.

== Collections ==
Bartow's work can be found in several museum collections including the Brooklyn Museum in Brooklyn, New York; the Peabody Essex Museum in Salem, Massachusetts; Eiteljorg Museum of American Indians and Western Art in Indianapolis, Indiana; the National Museum of the American Indian in Washington, DC; the Hallie Ford Museum of Art in Salem, Oregon; the Heard Museum in Phoenix, Arizona; the de Saisset Museum; Maryhill Museum of Art; and the Portland Art Museum. In 2003, his works were exhibited at the George Gustav Heye Center, a branch of the National Museum of the American Indian in New York City.

In Bartow's hometown of Newport, there are public displays of his works, including a permanent display of From the Heart: Author Drawings at the Newport Public Library. The Hatfield Marine Science Center Guin Library has public displays of Bartow's art, including Self Portrait with a Red nose (oil; 1989), Boat (wood and nails; 1998), Fish (wood and metal; no date) along with Ship of Fools (pastel on paper; 1993) at the Valley Library (Corvallis, Oregon).

== Personal ==
Bartow was also a musician and singer with his band, Bartow and the Backseat Drivers. He played the guitar including regular local performances in South Beach and Newport where he lived.

== Death ==
Rick Bartow died of congestive heart failure on April 2, 2016, at the age of 69.

== See also ==
- The Responsibility of Raising a Child, Portland, Oregon
