= Pena Bonita =

Oklahoma visual artist (born 1948)

- Born: 1948 (age 77–78)
- Education: Hunter College of New York
- Known for: Visual Artist

Pena Bonita (born 1948) is an Oklahoma Seminole/Apache visual artist and author. Her paintings and mixed media installations blend culture, art and religion—using line, color and form to speak to Native American values and experiences. Her work is displayed widely, including at the Smithsonian National Museum of the American Indian, Thunder Bay Museum, and at Long Island University. Pena Bonita's short story Lotto won the 2004 National Foundation Book Award. She has lectured and shown her work throughout the United States and Canada.

== Early life ==
Bonita grew up in Cloudcroft, New Mexico with a mix of Native American customs that included long stays with extended family. She grew up surrounded by artistic family activities like sewing, basketmaking, photography and drawing. Her mother was a quiltmaker while her grandmother's traditional baskets featured in several museums and collections including The Southwest Museum of the American Indian in Los Angeles, California.

== Education ==
Bonita received her Bachelor's degree at the City College of New York and then a Master of Fine Arts from Hunter College of New York in 1995 where she studied with Mark Feldstein and Roy Carroca.

== Career ==
Pena Bonita has made her home in New York's Lower East Side since the 1980s, where she raised her family of three boys. Her early work reflects the Native and women's liberation issues that engaged her during her time at Hunter College. One of her earlier installations included cut up pieces of pots and pans that were then painted and welded to a cross. Shortly after leaving Hunter Bonita was already being recognized a significant artist with her work with the American Indian Community House Gallery. This notice helped launched her career in New York galleries and on the exhibition circuit.

Interest in her work continues with mentions of Bonita's installations in Hypoallergenic in 2015 and in The New Yorker in 2018. Bonita was a featured artist inVoices on display from March 24, to May 2, 2019, at New York University's Kimmel Windows Galleries, put on in partnership with the American Indian Community House. One of Bonita's works is also appears in the permanent exhibit Indian Humor at the National Museum of the American Indian . In addition to being a visual artist, Bonita is a poet, short story, nonfiction writer and founding member of the American Indian Writer's Workshop.

== Selected exhibitions ==
- Old Bones. Thunder Bay Museum. Thunder Bay, Ontario, Canada.
- Corn Patch Series. State Capitol Gallery. Olympia, Washington.
- Indian Humor. The Museum of the American Indian. Smithsonian Institution.
- The Political Landscape. Long Island University. Brookville, New York.
- Stalled Series. Queens Museum. Queens, New York City.
