= Frank Tuttle (artist) =

Native American artist

Frank Tuttle (born 1957) is a contemporary Native American artist. He is from the Yuki people, Wailaki and Concow Maidu Native communities.

== Biography ==
Tuttle was born in Oroville, California. He completed his undergraduate degree at California State University, Humboldt (now called Humboldt State University). As of 2004, he was a lecturer in Native American Studies and Native American Art at Mendocino College in Ukiah. Much of Tuttle's artwork builds on a combination of modern artistic techniques and traditional modes of artistic development, such as dance and basket weaving.

Tuttle's work can be found in the museum collections at the Berkeley Art Museum and Pacific Film Archive, the C.N. Gorman Museum, the Crocker Art Museum, and the Morris Graves Museum of Art.
