= Jesse Cooday =

Jesse Cooday (born 1955, Ketchikan, Alaska) is a Tlinglit photographer, filmmaker, and mixed media artist who belongs to the Wooshkeetaan clan, which translates to the Eagle Shark Wolf clan.

== Biography ==
At seven months old, Cooday was adopted by his grandmother whose Indian name was Coogat. His Tlingit name is Shoowee Ka’, which means stands by the sea. This name belonged to his great uncle Seth Williams before his death in 1965. Deciding who will take on a name for future generations is generally determined by the elders of the tribe in the first couple of years of a child's life. His uncle noticed that Jesse Cooday had enjoyed standing by the sea since his childhood and for that reason at age ten Cooday was given his name at a potlatch that took place after his uncle's death. His grandmother was an elder who taught Tlingit dance and song within the community, therefore growing up he was surrounded by his lively culture and tradition which would influence his art in the coming years. He recounts many times in which he would see masks and tribal clothing in his room which he says was similar to the “backstage” of a show. After residing in Alaska for his entire childhood and teenage years, he moved to New York City to pursue his interest in the arts. Over the years he took various photos which commented on the society in New York. He later began to create art that reflected on his Native culture, which he intends to serve as a commentary in response to Native American myths set by non-natives. In 1996, he developed his website which displays his art and the inspirations behind it. Throughout his adulthood, he became deeply involved in activism. Besides creating art, Cooday has begun to create electronic music and sound art as well as serve a curatorial role for the American Indian Community House Gallery.

== Education ==
He attended high school in Petersburg, Alaska and graduated in 1972. Shortly after, he moved to New York City and in 1978 he began to attend The School of Visual Arts and studied photography until the year 1981. During his time, he developed a fascination with contemporary photography, specifically contemporary portraits after being introduced to many contemporary artists that inspired his work. Among them was Diane Arbus who took interest in capturing images of individuals outside of the mainstream population.

== Collections ==
- Denver Art Museum

== See also ==
- Photography by indigenous peoples of the Americas
- Edward S. Curtis
