= George Longfish =

First Nations artist and museum director

George Chester Longfish
- Born: August 22, 1942 (age 84); Ohsweken, Ontario, Canada
- Citizenship: Six Nations of the Grand River and Canada
- Education: School of the Art Institute of Chicago
- Occupations: Artist, professor, museum director
- Employer(s): University of California, Davis, C.N. Gorman Museum

George Chester Longfish (born August 22, 1942) is a First Nations artist, professor, and museum director. His art work blends Pop art with Indigenous motifs, and often features assemblage. Many of his works have been featured in major public museum exhibitions, including the Heard Museum, and the Smithsonian's National Museum of the American Indian. He was a professor of Native American Studies at the University of California, Davis (U.C. Davis), for almost 30 years. He served as the museum director at the C.N. Gorman Museum at U.C. Davis, from 1974 to 1996.

== Biography ==
Longfish was born on August 22, 1942, in Ohsweken, Ontario, Canada, he is from the Seneca and Tuscarora tribes. Ohsweken is a village on the Six Nations on the Grand River First Nation Indian Reserve. Longfish's mother left him and his brother when he was five years old. His mother took Longfish and his brother to the Thomas Indian School. At this school, Longfish and his brother had to take care of farm animals, slaughter them, and many agrarian tasks. As a child, Longfosh admired modern artists such as Frank Stella and Arshile Gorky. Longfish expressed in many of his paintings on how he endured his mother leaving him and how he slowly drifted away from his culture. Longfish and his brother were at the school for nine years. After the nine years of being separated from their mother, Longfish and his brother became alienated from their culture. Eventually, the school closed and Longfish and his brother moved back with their mother in Chicago. He attended Tuley High School in Chicago, Illinois.

Longfish earned his Bachelor of Fine Arts degree (1970) and his Master of Fine Arts degree (1972) at the School of the Art Institute of Chicago. During his time in college, Longfish was known as an "angry artist" as he expressed his anger and pain in his art. He used his arts to express how the colonists had truly changed the indigenous people's way of living. Longfish's art style consisted of stenciled text, pictures of indigenous people, and a variety of bright colors.

In 1972, the graduate program in American Indian Arts at the University of Montana was founded and managed by Longfish.

From 1973 until 2003, Longfish was a member of the faculty at the University of California, Davis' Native American Studies Department. He was added to the faculty when Carl Nelson Gorman had retired. In addition, Longfish served as the director of the C. N. Gorman Museum at the University of California Davis, from 1974 to 1996. In the mid-1970s Longfish was active in the San Francisco Bay Area art scene.

In 2003, Longfish retired as a professor and began making an art studio. Longfish lives in South Berwick, Maine, and has a studio at Rollinsford, New Hampshire.

== Artworks ==
Longfish has dedicated his life to making artwork. He is known internationally throughout the world. His paintings often include text and bright colors. Despite having bright colors, his artwork shows the pain and anger throughout his life that he had endured. Many of Longfish's artwork, deal with the current issues of Indigenous people.

=== As Above So Below ===
As Above So Below (1997) at the National Gallery of Art in 2023

Longfish's As Above So Below portrays a black-and-white painted Pawnee chief sitting next to a cheeseburger. The background features bright colors with words such as truth, honor, earth, respect, below, honesty, lies, air, reincarnation, and fire. The painting also has the year 1997 written on it and the word water flipped upside down. That year Brazil became the world's biggest export of beef for fast-food. Therefore, people would destroy nature just to export fast food products. In addition, the words on the painting, such as the upside-down water, also symbolize how Indigenous values have been flipped upside down due to colonization. From what the viewer can see, Longfish paints this painting to try to express how he had to forget many of his cultural beliefs as he grew up and how they should not be forgotten.

=== Spirit ===
In this painting Spirit, Longfish paints a Pawnee chief in black and white once again. However, this time, the date he was born on is painted on the artwork. In addition, many phrases such as "Honoring women family children our histories memories", "broken treaties", "toxic waste dump", "genocide" and "disease" are written in the background. This painting symbolizes how colonists came to America and laid waste to many of the tribes. Colonists often made treaties with indigenous people, only to break them later. Also, they destroyed nature by building there factories and houses that all excreted toxic chemicals. Many of these colonists also brought diseases along with them, killing many indigenous people. As the viewer examines the painting, one can tell Longfish paints this painting to show how colonists have changed the way of living for indigenous people and caused many children to lose their parents and families to war or sickness.

=== Lightly Salted ===
The mixed-media Lightly Salted (1990) features Land O'Lakes "lightly salted" butter packaging with images of "Mia" the Native woman. Above the butter packaging is a bright red church and angels, painted much like a Guna mola. Brilliantly colored arrows and zigzags flare outward, including ones cut from reflective metallic paper. The artist statement explains, "This artwork is a political statement of a people who have endured and survived."

== Group exhibitions ==
- 1994: "Cultural Contrasts", Stamford Museum and Nature Center, Stamford, Connecticut
- 1992: "500 Years Since Columbus", Triton Museum of Art, Santa Clara, California
- 1992: "Haudenosaunee Artists: A Common Heritage", Tower Fine Art Gallery, State University of New York, Brockport, New York
- 1992: "Indigena: Contemporary Native Perspectives", Canadian Museum of Civilization, Hull, Quebec
- 1992–1994: "The Submuloc Show/Columbus Wohs", Atlatl, Phoenix, Arizona
- 1992–1993: "We, The Human Beings/27 Contemporary Native American Artists", College of Wooster Art Museum, Wooster, Ohio
- 1991–1992: Acknowledging Our Host: Communal Sources, Richmond Art Center, Richmond, California
- 1991: America, Center for Contemporary Art, Sacramento, California
- 1991–1993: Our Land/Ourselves, University Art Gallery, State University of New York, Albany, Albany, New York
- 1991–1993: Shared Visions, Heard Museum, Phoenix, Arizona
- 1990: The Decade Show, New Museum of Contemporary Art, New York City, New York
- 1987–1988: "Eight Native American Artists", Fort Wayne Museum of Art, Fort Wayne, Indiana
- 1985–1986: "The Extension of Tradition", Crocker Art Museum, Sacramento, California
- 1979: "George C. Longfish Mary L. O'Neal: Works on Canvas", San Francisco Museum of Modern Art, San Francisco, California.

== Solo exhibitions ==
- 2008: "George Longfish a Retrospective" (2008), Paris Gibson Square Museum of Art, Missoula, Montana
- 1989: "George Longfish", Jennifer Pauls Gallery, Sacramento, California
- 1989: "George Longfish Paintings", LRC Gallery, College of the Siskiyous, Weed, California
- 1986: "Common Ground: New Works by George Longfish", Bernice Steinbaum Gallery, New York City, New York
- 1971: Second Unitarian Church, Chicago, Illinois
- San Francisco Art Institute, California
- Washington State University, Pullman
- University of Montana
- Yuba College, Woodland, California

== Collections ==
- Northwest Museum of Arts and Culture
- Art Institute of Chicago
- Hood Museum of Art

== Awards ==
- Contemporary Indian Art Exhibition, Central Washington University, Ellensburg, Washington (1974, Juror's grand Award; 1977, 1st; 1980, 1st)
- Heard Museum (1973)
- October ArtFest, Davis, California (1981, 1st)

== Publications ==
- Morris, Kate (2007). George Longfish: A Retrospective (exhibition catalog). Montana Museum of Art & Culture. Missoula, MT: University of Montana Press. ISBN 9780975400968. OCLC 123129873.
