= Theodore Roosevelt =

President of the United States from 1901 to 1909

- Roosevelt in 1904

26th President of the United States
- In office September 14, 1901 – March 4, 1909
- Vice President: Vacant (1901–1905) (Note: Roosevelt was vice president under McKinley and became president after McKinley's assassination in 1901. This was prior to the adoption of the Twenty-fifth Amendment in 1967, and the vacancy in the office of vice president was not filled until the next election and inauguration.); Charles W. Fairbanks (1905–1909)
- Preceded by: William McKinley
- Succeeded by: William Howard Taft

25th Vice President of the United States
- In office March 4, 1901 – September 14, 1901
- President: William McKinley
- Preceded by: Garret Hobart
- Succeeded by: Charles W. Fairbanks

33rd Governor of New York
- In office January 1, 1899 – December 31, 1900
- Lieutenant: Timothy L. Woodruff
- Preceded by: Frank S. Black
- Succeeded by: Benjamin Barker Odell Jr.

Assistant Secretary of the Navy
- In office April 19, 1897 – May 10, 1898
- President: William McKinley
- Preceded by: William McAdoo
- Succeeded by: Charles Herbert Allen

New York City Police Commissioner
- In office May 6, 1895 – April 19, 1897
- Appointed by: William Lafayette Strong
- Preceded by: James J. Martin
- Succeeded by: Frank Moss

Minority Leader of the New York State Assembly
- In office January 1, 1883 – December 31, 1883
- Preceded by: Thomas G. Alvord
- Succeeded by: Frank Rice

Member of the New York State Assembly from the 21st district
- In office January 1, 1882 – December 31, 1884
- Preceded by: William J. Trimble
- Succeeded by: Henry A. Barnum

Personal details
- Born: Theodore Roosevelt Jr. October 27, 1858 New York City, U.S.
- Died: January 6, 1919 (aged 60) Sagamore Hill, New York, U.S.
- Resting place: Youngs Memorial Cemetery
- Party: Republican (1880–1912, 1916–1919)
- Other political affiliations: Bull Moose Party (1912–1916)
- Spouses: Alice Lee (m. 1880; died 1884); Edith Carow (m. 1886)
- Children: 6
- Relatives: Roosevelt family
- Education: Harvard University (AB)
- Occupation: Author; conservationist; explorer; historian; naturalist; police commissioner; politician; soldier
- Civilian awards: Nobel Peace Prize (1906)

Military service
- Allegiance: United States
- Branch/service: United States Army
- Years of service: 1882–1886 (guard); 1898
- Rank: Colonel
- Unit: New York Army National Guard
- Commands: 1st U.S. Volunteer Cavalry
- Battles/wars: Spanish–American War; Battle of Las Guasimas; Battle of San Juan Hill
- Military awards: Medal of Honor (posthumous, 2001)
- Theodore Roosevelt's voice Roosevelt giving a speech during his second presidential campaign Recorded March 12, 1912

Theodore Roosevelt Jr. (Note: Pronounced /ˈroʊzəvɛlt/ ROH-zə-velt) (October 27, 1858 – January 6, 1919) was the 26th president of the United States, serving from 1901 to 1909. A member of the Republican Party and the 25th vice president, he assumed the presidency after President William McKinley was assassinated. Roosevelt was the youngest person to be president, at 42 years old.

A sickly child with debilitating asthma, Roosevelt overcame health problems through a regime of vigorous exercise, which he called "the strenuous life". He was homeschooled and began a lifelong naturalist avocation before attending Harvard University. His book The Naval War of 1812 established his reputation as a historian and popular writer. Roosevelt became leader of the reform faction of Republicans in the New York State Legislature. After the simultaneous deaths of his first wife Alice Hathaway Lee Roosevelt and mother Martha Bulloch Roosevelt, he recuperated by buying and operating a cattle ranch in the Dakotas. Roosevelt served as the assistant secretary of the Navy under McKinley, and in 1898 helped plan the successful naval war against Spain. He resigned to help form and lead the Rough Riders, a unit that fought the Spanish Army in Cuba to great publicity. Returning a war hero, Roosevelt was elected New York's governor in 1898. Because the New York state party leadership disliked his ambitious state agenda, they convinced McKinley to choose him as his running mate in the 1900 presidential election. The McKinley–Roosevelt ticket won a landslide victory.

As a leader of the progressive movement, Roosevelt championed his "Square Deal" domestic policies after taking over as president, which called for fairness for all citizens, breaking corporate trusts, regulating railroads, and pure food and drugs. His pursuit of antitrust litigation in particular earned him the nickname "the Trust Buster". Roosevelt prioritized conservation and established national parks, forests, and monuments to preserve U.S. natural resources. In foreign policy, he focused on Central America, beginning construction of the Panama Canal. Roosevelt expanded the U.S. Navy and sent the Great White Fleet on a world tour to project naval power. His successful efforts to end the Russo-Japanese War won him the 1906 Nobel Peace Prize, the first non-European to win a Nobel Prize. He was elected to a full term in 1904 and convinced William Howard Taft, his Secretary of War, to succeed him in 1908.

Roosevelt grew frustrated with Taft's brand of conservatism yet failed to win the 1912 Republican presidential nomination. He founded the Bull Moose Party and ran in 1912; the split allowed the Democrat Woodrow Wilson to win. Roosevelt led a four-month expedition to the Amazon basin, where he nearly died of tropical disease. During World War I, he criticized Wilson for keeping the U.S. out; his offer to lead volunteers to France was rejected. Roosevelt's health deteriorated and he died in 1919. Polls of historians and political scientists rank him as one of the greatest presidents in American history.

== Early life and education ==
Roosevelt in 1870; at age 11

Theodore Roosevelt Jr. was born at 28 East 20th Street in the Flatiron District of Manhattan, New York on October 27, 1858. His parents were Martha Stewart Bulloch and businessman Theodore Roosevelt Sr. He had an older sister Anna (called Bamie), a younger brother Elliott, and a younger sister Corinne.

Roosevelt's youth was shaped by his poor health and debilitating asthma attacks, which terrified him and his parents. Doctors had no cure. Nevertheless, he was energetic and mischievously inquisitive. His lifelong interest in zoology began at age seven when he saw a dead seal at a market; after obtaining the seal's head, Roosevelt and his cousins formed the "Roosevelt Museum of Natural History". Having learned the rudiments of taxidermy, he filled his makeshift museum with animals he killed or caught. At age nine, he recorded his observations in a paper entitled "The Natural History of Insects".

Family trips, including tours of Europe in 1869 and 1870, and Egypt in 1872, shaped his cosmopolitan perspective. Hiking with his family in the Alps in 1869, Roosevelt discovered the benefits of physical exertion to minimize his asthma and bolster his spirits. During one visit to Rome, Italy in 1870, Roosevelt met Pope Pius IX and even kissed his hand. This is despite the fact that he did not believe in Popes at the time and 'no real American would'. Roosevelt began a heavy regimen of exercise. After being manhandled by older boys on the way to a camping trip, he found a boxing coach to train him.

=== Education ===
Roosevelt was homeschooled. Biographer H. W. Brands wrote that "The most obvious drawback...was uneven coverage of...various areas of...knowledge." He was solid in geography and bright in history, biology, French, and German; however, he struggled in mathematics and the classical languages.

In September 1876, he entered Harvard University. His father instructed him to "take care of your morals first, your health next, and finally your studies." His father's sudden death in 1878 devastated Roosevelt. He inherited US$60,000 (equivalent to $1.75 million in 2025), on which he could live comfortably for the rest of his life.

His father, a devout Presbyterian, had regularly led the family in prayers. While at Harvard, young adult Theodore emulated him by teaching Sunday School for more than three years at the Episcopal Christ Church in Cambridge, Massachusetts. When the minister at Christ Church insisted he become an Episcopalian to continue teaching, Roosevelt declined, and began teaching a mission class in a poor section of Cambridge.

Roosevelt did well in science, philosophy, and rhetoric courses, but struggled in Latin and Greek. He was already an accomplished naturalist and a published ornithologist, and studied biology intently. He read prodigiously with an almost photographic memory. Roosevelt participated in rowing and boxing, and was a member of the Alpha Delta Phi literary society, the Delta Kappa Epsilon fraternity, and the prestigious Porcellian Club. In 1880, Roosevelt graduated Phi Beta Kappa (22nd of 177) with an A.B. magna cum laude. Henry F. Pringle wrote:

Roosevelt, attempting to analyze his college career and weigh the benefits he had received, felt that he had obtained little from Harvard. He had been depressed by the formalistic treatment of many subjects, by the rigidity, the attention to minutiae that were important in themselves, but which somehow were never linked up with the whole.

Roosevelt gave up his plan of studying natural science and attended Columbia Law School, moving back into his family's home in New York. (Note: In 2008, Columbia awarded Roosevelt a posthumous Juris Doctor degree.) Although Roosevelt was an able student, he found law to be irrational. Determined to enter politics, Roosevelt began attending meetings at Morton Hall, the headquarters of New York's 21st District Republican Association. Though Roosevelt's father had been a prominent member of the Republican Party, Roosevelt made an unorthodox career choice for someone of his class, as most of Roosevelt's peers refrained from becoming too closely involved in politics. Roosevelt found allies in the local Republican Party and defeated a Republican state assemblyman tied closely to the political machine of Senator Roscoe Conkling. After his election victory, Roosevelt dropped out of law school, later saying, "I intended to be one of the governing class."

=== Naval history and strategy ===
While at Harvard, Roosevelt began a systematic study of the role played by the United States Navy in the War of 1812. He published The Naval War of 1812 in 1882. The book included comparisons of British and American leadership down to the ship-to-ship level. It was praised for its scholarship and style, and remains a standard study of the war.

Some believed Roosevelt's naval ideas were derived from author Alfred Thayer Mahan, who popularized a concept that only nations with significant naval power had been able to influence history, dominate oceans, exert their diplomacy to the fullest, and defend their borders, but naval historian Nicholas Danby states that Roosevelt's ideas predated meeting Mahan or reading his work.

== Political beginnings ==
=== New York State Assemblyman (1881–1884) ===
Roosevelt as a State Assemblyman, 1884

In 1881, Roosevelt won election to the New York State Assembly, representing the 21st district, which was centered on the "Silk Stocking District" of New York County's Upper East Side. He served in the 1882, 1883, and 1884 sessions of the legislature.

Roosevelt began making his mark immediately. He blocked a corrupt effort of financier Jay Gould to lower his taxes. Roosevelt exposed the collusion of Gould and Judge Theodoric R. Westbrook and successfully argued for an investigation, aiming for the judge to be impeached. Although the investigation committee rejected the impeachment, Roosevelt had exposed corruption in Albany and assumed a high and positive profile in New York publications.

Roosevelt's anti-corruption efforts helped him win re-election in 1882 by a margin greater than two-to-one, an achievement made more impressive by the victory that Democratic gubernatorial candidate Grover Cleveland won in Roosevelt's district. With Senator Conkling's Stalwart faction of the Republican Party in disarray following the assassination of James A. Garfield, Roosevelt won election as party leader in the state assembly. He allied with Governor Cleveland to win passage of a civil service reform bill. Roosevelt won re-election and sought the office of Speaker, but Titus Sheard obtained the position. Roosevelt served as Chairman of the Committee on Affairs of Cities, during which he wrote more bills than any other legislator.

==== New York National Guard ====
While serving in the assembly, Roosevelt joined the New York National Guard. Commissioned in August 1882 as a second lieutenant in Company B, 8th Infantry Regiment, he served until February 1886. Roosevelt left the National Guard as a captain and later described his initial military service as "invaluable" because it helped develop his abilities to organize men and train them in basic soldiering skills.

=== 1884 presidential election ===
With numerous presidential hopefuls, Roosevelt supported Senator George F. Edmunds of Vermont. The state Republican Party preferred incumbent president, Chester Arthur, who was known for passing the Pendleton Civil Service Reform Act. Roosevelt succeeded in influencing the Manhattan delegates at the state convention. He then took control of the convention, bargaining through the night and outmaneuvering supporters of Arthur and James G. Blaine; consequently, he gained a national reputation as a key politician in his state.

Roosevelt attended the 1884 Republican National Convention in Chicago, where he gave a speech convincing delegates to nominate African American John R. Lynch, an Edmunds supporter, to be temporary chair. Roosevelt fought alongside the Mugwump reformers against Blaine. However, Blaine gained support from Arthur's and Edmunds's delegates, and won the nomination. In a crucial moment of his budding career, Roosevelt resisted the demand of fellow Mugwumps that he bolt from Blaine. He bragged: "We achieved a victory in getting up a combination to beat the Blaine nominee for temporary chairman...this needed...skill, boldness and energy... to get the different factions to come in... to defeat the common foe." He was impressed by an invitation to speak before an audience of ten thousand, the largest crowd he had addressed up to then.

Having gotten a taste of national politics, Roosevelt felt less aspiration for advocacy on the state level; he retired to his new "Chimney Butte Ranch" on the Little Missouri River. Roosevelt refused to join other Mugwumps in supporting Cleveland, the Democratic nominee in the general election. After Blaine won the nomination, Roosevelt carelessly said he would give "hearty support to any decent Democrat". He distanced himself from the promise, saying that it had not been meant "for publication". When a reporter asked if he would support Blaine, Roosevelt replied, "I decline to answer." In the end, he realized he had to support Blaine to maintain his role in the party and did so in a press release. Having lost the support of many reformers, and still reeling from the deaths of his wife and mother, Roosevelt decided to retire from politics and moved to North Dakota.

=== 1886 New York City mayoral election ===
"Age Before Beauty!" a political cartoon published in Puck depicting Roosevelt's defeat by Abram Hewitt, November 10, 1886

Upon Roosevelt's return to New York, Republican leaders approached him about running for mayor of New York City in the 1886 election. Roosevelt accepted the nomination despite having little hope against United Labor Party candidate Henry George and Democrat Abram Hewitt. Roosevelt campaigned hard, but Hewitt won with 41%, taking the votes of many Republicans who feared George's radical policies. George was held to 31%, and Roosevelt took third with 27%. Fearing his political career might never recover, Roosevelt turned to writing The Winning of the West, tracking the westward movement of Americans; it was a great success, earning favorable reviews and selling all copies from the first printing.

=== Civil Service Commission (1889–1895) ===
After Benjamin Harrison unexpectedly defeated James G. Blaine for the presidential nomination at the 1888 Republican National Convention, Roosevelt gave stump speeches in the Midwest in support of Harrison. On the insistence of Henry Cabot Lodge, President Harrison appointed Roosevelt to the United States Civil Service Commission, where he served until 1895. While many of his predecessors had approached the office as a sinecure, Roosevelt fought the spoilsmen and demanded enforcement of civil service laws. This included his efforts to extend classification of the Civil Service to all offices in the Indian Bureau as well as advocating for Native Americans to take part wherever possible in agency affairs. The Sun described Roosevelt as "irrepressible, belligerent, and enthusiastic". Roosevelt clashed with Postmaster General John Wanamaker, who handed out patronage positions to Harrison supporters, and Roosevelt's attempt to force out several postal workers damaged Harrison politically. Despite Roosevelt's support for Harrison's reelection in the 1892 presidential election, the winner, Grover Cleveland, reappointed him. Roosevelt's close friend and biographer, Joseph Bucklin Bishop, described his assault on the spoils system:

The very citadel of spoils politics, the hitherto impregnable fortress that had existed unshaken since it was erected on the foundation laid by Andrew Jackson, was tottering to its fall under the assaults of this audacious and irrepressible young man... Whatever may have been the feelings of the (fellow Republican party) President (Harrison)—and there is little doubt that he had no idea when he appointed Roosevelt that he would prove to be so veritable a bull in a china shop—he refused to remove him and stood by him firmly till the end of his term.

=== New York City Police Commissioner (1895–1897) ===
Roosevelt in his office as New York City Police Commissioner, 1895

In 1894, reform Republicans approached Roosevelt about running for Mayor of New York again; he declined, mostly due to his wife's resistance to being removed from the Washington social set. Soon after, he realized he had missed an opportunity to reinvigorate a dormant political career. He retreated to the Dakotas; Edith regretted her role in the decision and vowed there would be no repeat.

William Lafayette Strong won the 1894 mayoral election and offered Roosevelt a position as President of the New York City Board of Police Commissioners. Roosevelt became president of commissioners and radically reformed the police force: he implemented regular inspections of firearms and physical exams, appointed recruits based on their physical and mental qualifications rather than political affiliation, established Meritorious Service Medals, closed corrupt police hostelries, and had telephones installed in station houses.

In 1894, Roosevelt met Jacob Riis, the muckraking Evening Sun journalist who was opening the eyes of New Yorkers to the terrible conditions of the city's immigrants with such books as How the Other Half Lives. Riis described how his book affected Roosevelt:

When Roosevelt read [my] book, he came... No one ever helped as he did. For two years we were brothers in (New York City's crime-ridden) Mulberry Street. When he left I had seen its golden age... There is very little ease where Theodore Roosevelt leads, as we all of us found out. The lawbreaker found it out who predicted scornfully that he would "knuckle down to politics the way they all did", and lived to respect him, though he swore at him, as the one of them all who was stronger than pull... that was what made the age golden, that for the first time a moral purpose came into the street. In the light of it everything was transformed.

Roosevelt made a habit of walking officers' beats at night and early in the morning to make sure that they were on duty. He made a concerted effort to uniformly enforce New York's Sunday closing law; in this, he ran up against Tom Platt and Tammany Hall—he was notified the Police Commission was being legislated out of existence. His crackdowns led to protests. Invited to one large demonstration, not only did he accept, but he delighted in the insults and lampoons directed at him, and earned goodwill. Roosevelt chose to defer rather than split with his party.

== Spanish-American War ==
=== Assistant Secretary of the Navy (1897–1898) ===
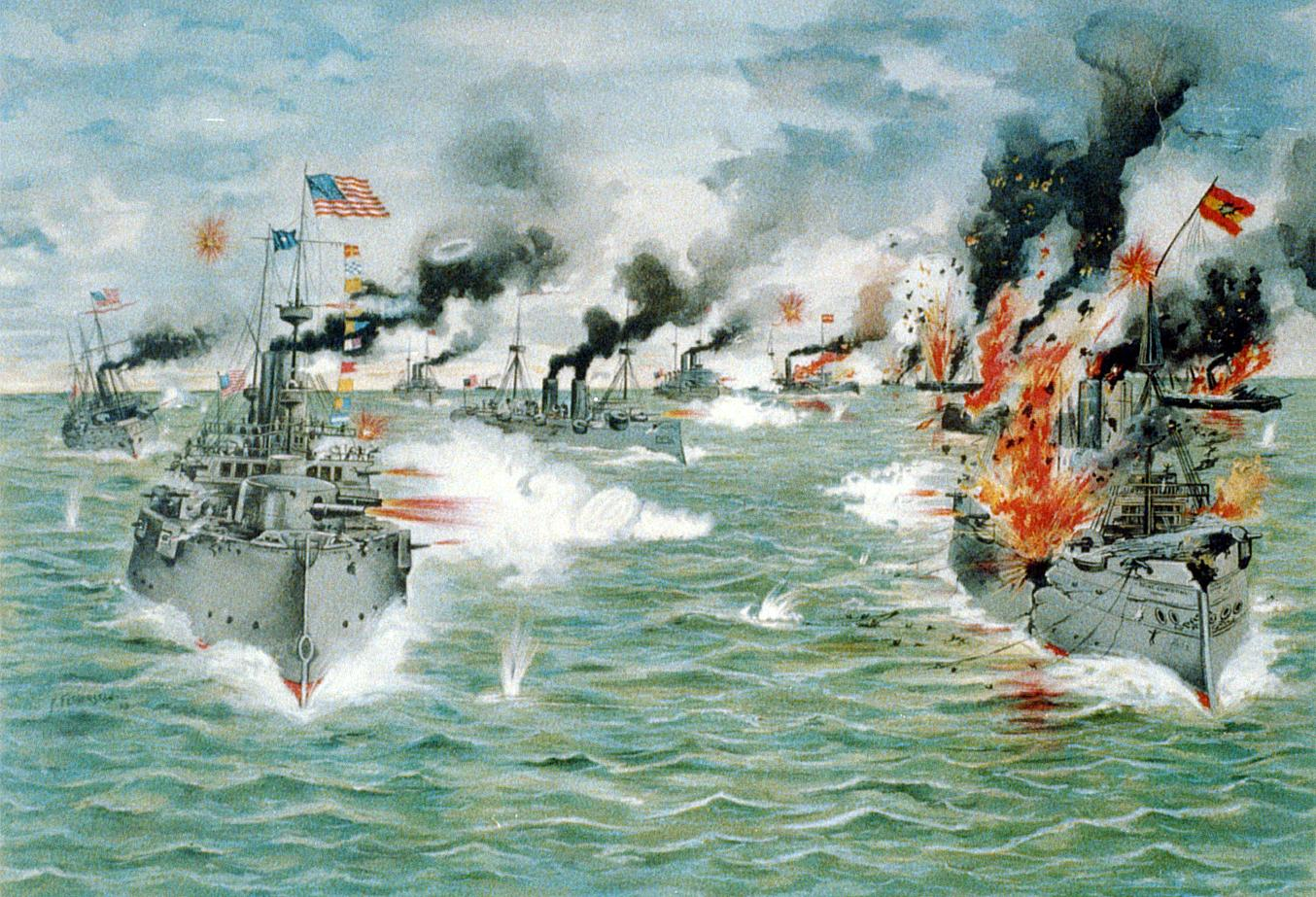
The Asiatic Squadron destroying the Spanish fleet in the Battle of Manila Bay on May 1, 1898

In the 1896 presidential election, Roosevelt backed Thomas Brackett Reed for the Republican nomination, but William McKinley won the nomination and defeated William Jennings Bryan in the general election. Roosevelt strongly opposed Bryan's free silver platform, viewing many of Bryan's followers as dangerous fanatics. He gave campaign speeches for McKinley. Urged by Senator Henry Cabot Lodge, President McKinley appointed Roosevelt as the Assistant Secretary of the Navy in 1897. Secretary of the Navy John D. Long was in poor health and left many major decisions to Roosevelt. Influenced by Alfred Thayer Mahan, Roosevelt called for a build-up in naval strength, particularly the construction of battleships. Roosevelt also began pressing his national security views regarding the Pacific and the Caribbean on McKinley and was adamant that Spain be ejected from Cuba. He explained his priorities to one of the Navy's planners in late 1897:

I would regard war with Spain from two viewpoints: first, the advisability on the grounds both of humanity and self-interest of interfering on behalf of the Cubans, and of taking one more step toward the complete freeing of America from European dominion; second, the benefit done our people by giving them something to think of which is not material gain, and especially the benefit done our military forces by trying both the Navy and Army in actual practice.

==== USS Maine ====
On February 15, 1898, the armored cruiser USS Maine exploded in the harbor of Havana, Cuba, killing hundreds of crew. While Roosevelt and many other Americans blamed Spain for the explosion, McKinley sought a diplomatic solution. Without approval from Long or McKinley, Roosevelt sent out orders to several naval vessels to prepare for war. George Dewey, who had received an appointment to lead the Asiatic Squadron with the backing of Roosevelt, later credited his victory at the Battle of Manila Bay to Roosevelt's orders. After giving up hope of a peaceful solution, McKinley asked Congress to declare war on Spain, beginning the Spanish–American War.

=== Rough Riders (1898) ===
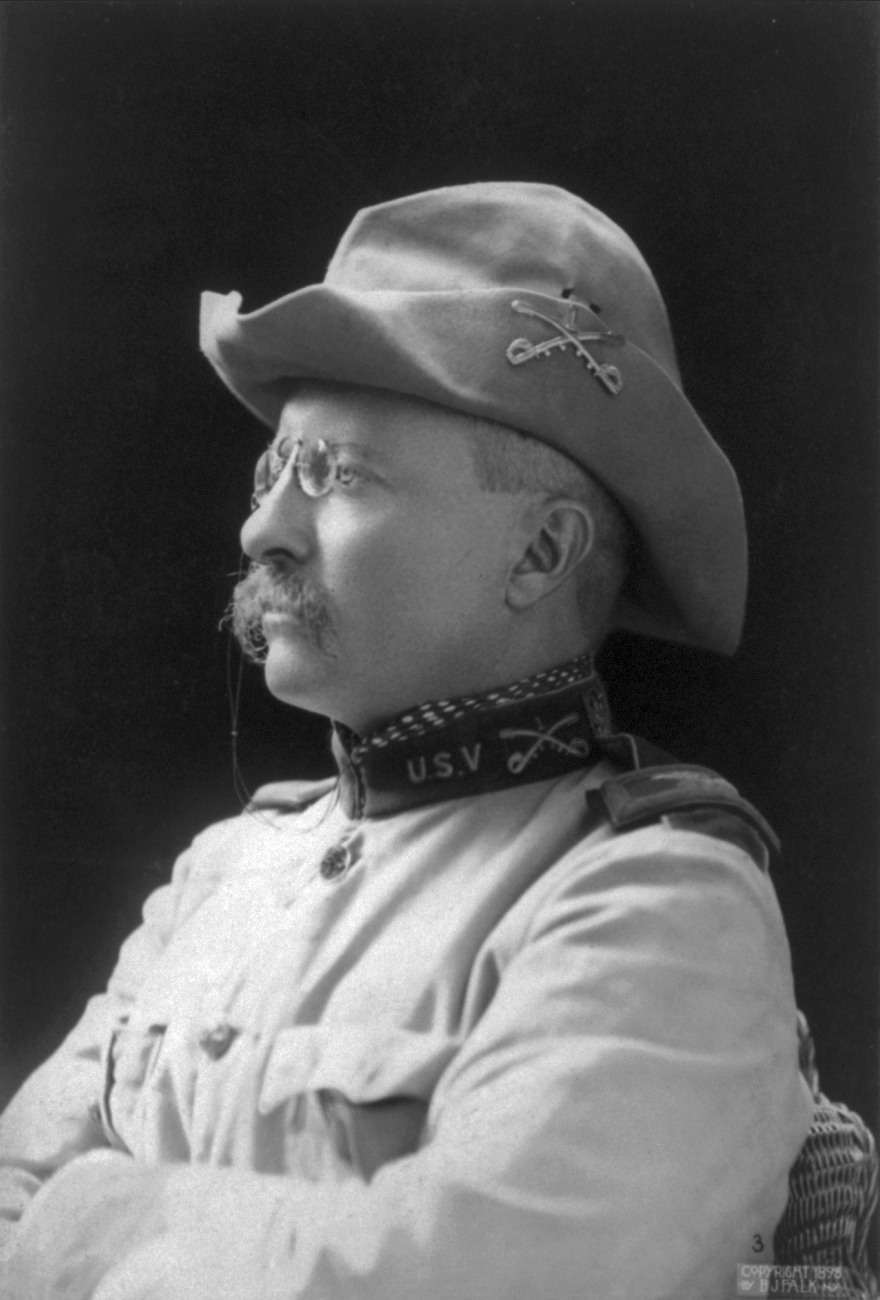
Colonel Roosevelt in 1898

With the beginning of the Spanish–American War in 1898, Roosevelt resigned as Assistant Secretary of the Navy. Along with Army Colonel Leonard Wood, he formed the First U.S. Volunteer Cavalry Regiment. His wife and many friends begged Roosevelt to remain in Washington, but Roosevelt was determined to see battle. When the newspapers reported the formation of the new regiment, Roosevelt and Wood were flooded with applications. Referred to by the press as the "Rough Riders", it was one of many temporary units active only during the war.

The regiment trained for several weeks in San Antonio, Texas, in what is now known as Roosevelt Park. In his autobiography, Roosevelt wrote that his experience with the New York National Guard enabled him to immediately begin teaching basic soldiering skills. Diversity characterized the regiment, which included Ivy Leaguers, athletes, frontiersmen, Native Americans, hunters, miners, former soldiers, tradesmen, and sheriffs. The Rough Riders were part of the cavalry division commanded by former Confederate general Joseph Wheeler. During regiment training, Roosevelt once treated the entire squadron to unlimited beer as a reward for improvement in drill. He was reprimanded by a superior officer for the act, reminding him that "an officer who would go out with a large batch of men and drink with them was quite unfit to hold a commission". On the incident, one soldier later commented that "Nectar... never tasted as good as that beer". Roosevelt and his men landed in Daiquirí, Cuba, on June 23, 1898, and marched to Siboney. Wheeler sent the Rough Riders on a parallel road northwest running along a ridge up from the beach. Roosevelt took command of the regiment; he had his first experience in combat when the Rough Riders met Spanish troops in a skirmish known as the Battle of Las Guasimas. They fought their way through Spanish resistance and, together with the Regulars, forced the Spaniards to abandon their positions.

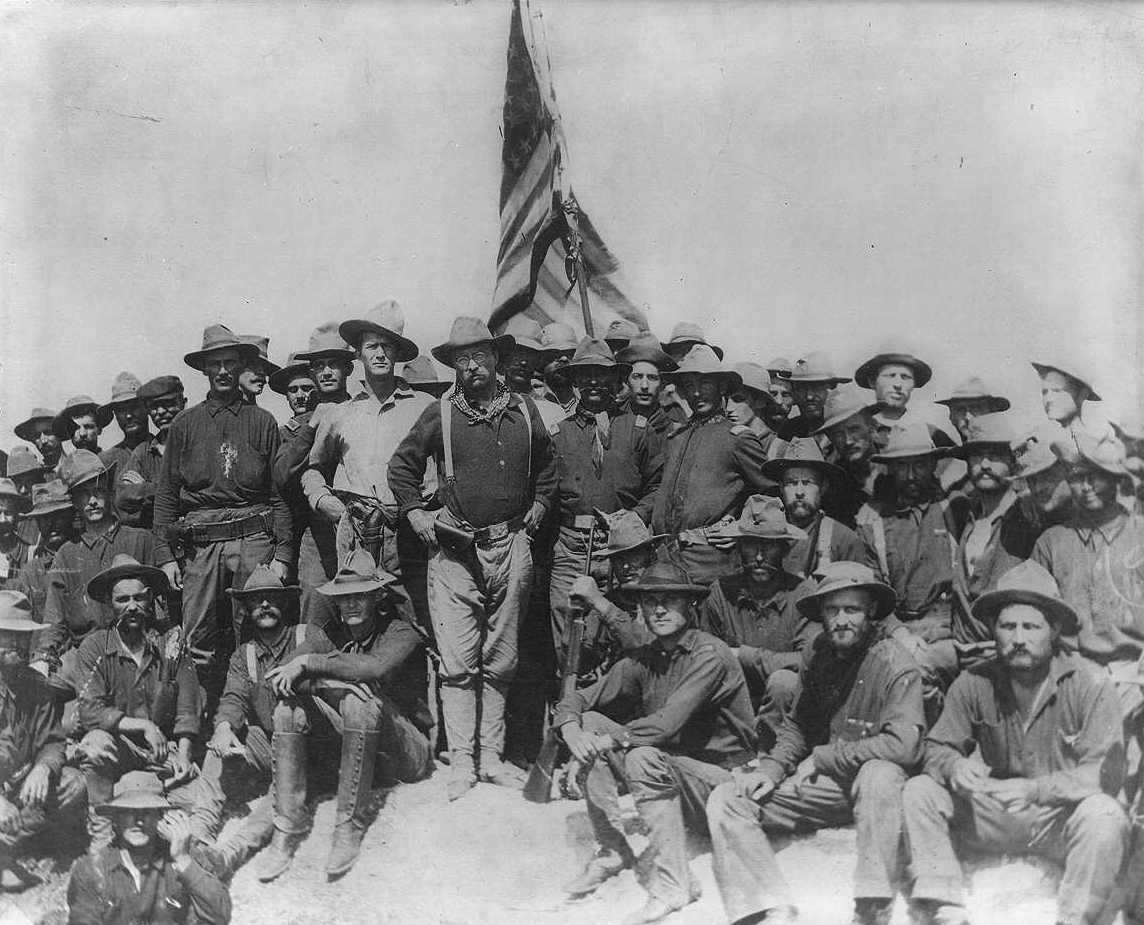
Colonel Roosevelt and the Rough Riders along with members of the 3rd Volunteers and the 10th Cavalry Regiment after capturing Kettle Hill in Cuba during the Spanish–American War in July 1898

On July 1, in a combined assault with the Regulars, under Roosevelt's leadership, the Rough Riders became famous for charges up Kettle Hill and San Juan Hill. Roosevelt was the only soldier on horseback, as he rode back and forth between rifle pits at the forefront of the advance up Kettle Hill, an advance that he urged despite the absence of orders. He was forced to walk up the last part of Kettle Hill because his horse had been entangled in barbed wire. The assaults would become known as the Battle of San Juan Heights. The victories came at a cost of 200 killed and 1,000 wounded. Roosevelt personally killed one Spaniard with a revolver salvaged from the USS Maine during this assault.

In August, with many of the men suffering from yellow fever, Roosevelt and other officers signed the Round-Robin Letter, demanding that the soldiers be returned home. In response, there were muttered threats from the War Department that Roosevelt should face a court martial and publications, including The Philadelphia Press, believed this had squandered his chances of being nominated for future office including by the Republican Party for Governor of New York. However, within three days, the army had been ordered to Montauk, New York with Roosevelt receiving the public credit for influencing the decision. Roosevelt recalled San Juan Heights as "the great day of my life". After returning to civilian life, Roosevelt preferred to be known as "Colonel Roosevelt" or "The Colonel". "Teddy" remained much more popular with the public, though Roosevelt openly despised that moniker.

== Governor of New York (1899–1900) ==
Shortly after Roosevelt's return, Republican Congressman Lemuel E. Quigg, a lieutenant of New York machine boss Thomas C. Platt, asked Roosevelt to run in the 1898 gubernatorial election. Prospering politically from the Platt machine, Roosevelt's rise to power was marked by the pragmatic decisions of Platt, who disliked Roosevelt. Platt feared Roosevelt would oppose his interests in office and was reluctant to propel Roosevelt to the forefront of national politics, but needed a strong candidate due to the unpopularity of the incumbent Republican governor, Frank S. Black. Roosevelt agreed to become the nominee and to try not to "make war" with the Republican establishment once in office. Roosevelt defeated Black in the Republican caucus, and faced Democrat Augustus Van Wyck, a well-respected judge, in the general election. Roosevelt campaigned on his war record, winning by just 1%.

As governor, Roosevelt learned about economic issues and political techniques that proved valuable in his presidency. He studied the problems of trusts, monopolies, labor relations, and conservation. G. Wallace Chessman argues that Roosevelt's program "rested firmly upon the concept of the square deal by a neutral state". The rules for the Square Deal were "honesty in public affairs, an equitable sharing of privilege and responsibility, and subordination of party and local concerns to the interests of the state at large".

By holding twice-daily press conferences—an innovation—Roosevelt remained connected with his middle-class base. Roosevelt successfully pushed the Ford Franchise-Tax bill, which taxed public franchises granted by the state and controlled by corporations, declaring that "a corporation which derives its powers from the State, should pay to the State a just percentage of its earnings as a return for the privileges it enjoys". He rejected Platt worries that this approached Bryanite Socialism, explaining that without it, New York voters might get angry and adopt public ownership of streetcar lines and other franchises.

Power to make appointments to policy-making positions was a key role for the governor. Platt insisted he be consulted on major appointments; Roosevelt appeared to comply, but then made his own decisions. Historians marvel that Roosevelt managed to appoint so many first-rate people with Platt's approval. He even enlisted Platt's help in securing reform, such as in spring 1899, when Platt pressured state senators to vote for a civil service bill that the secretary of the Civil Service Reform Association called "superior to any civil service statute heretofore secured in America".

Chessman argues that as governor, Roosevelt developed the principles that shaped his presidency, especially insistence upon the public responsibility of large corporations, publicity as a first remedy for trusts, regulation of railroad rates, mediation of the conflict of capital and labor, conservation of natural resources and protection of the poor. Roosevelt sought to position himself against the excesses of large corporations and radical movements.

As chief executive of the most populous state, Roosevelt was widely considered a potential presidential candidate, and supporters such as William Allen White encouraged him to run. Roosevelt had no interest in challenging McKinley for the nomination in 1900 and was denied his preferred post of Secretary of War. As his term progressed, Roosevelt pondered a 1904 run, but was uncertain about whether he should seek re-election as governor in 1900.

== Vice presidency (1901) ==
In November 1899, Vice President Garret Hobart died, leaving an open spot on the 1900 Republican national ticket. Though Henry Cabot Lodge and others urged him to run for vice president in 1900, Roosevelt issued a public statement saying that he would not accept the nomination. Eager to be rid of Roosevelt, Platt nonetheless began a newspaper campaign in favor of Roosevelt's nomination. Roosevelt attended the 1900 Republican National Convention as a state delegate and struck a bargain with Platt: Roosevelt would accept the nomination if the convention offered it to him but would otherwise serve another term as governor. Platt asked Pennsylvania party boss Matthew Quay to lead the campaign for Roosevelt's nomination, and Quay outmaneuvered Mark Hanna at the convention to put Roosevelt on the ticket. Roosevelt won the nomination unanimously.

Roosevelt's vice-presidential campaigning proved highly energetic and a match for Democratic presidential nominee William Jennings Bryan's barnstorming style. In a whirlwind campaign that displayed his energy to the public, Roosevelt made 480 stops in 23 states. He denounced the radicalism of Bryan, contrasting it with the heroism of those who won the war against Spain. Bryan had strongly supported the war itself, but he denounced the annexation of the Philippines as imperialism. Roosevelt countered that it was best for the Filipinos to have stability and the Americans to have a proud place in the world. The voters gave McKinley an even larger victory than that which he had achieved in 1896.

Roosevelt took office as vice president in March 1901. The office was a powerless sinecure and did not suit Roosevelt's aggressive temperament. Roosevelt's six months as vice president were uneventful and boring for a man of action. He had no power; he presided over the Senate for a mere four days before it adjourned. On September 2, 1901, Roosevelt first publicized an aphorism that thrilled his supporters: "Speak softly and carry a big stick, and you will go far."

== Presidency (1901–1909) ==
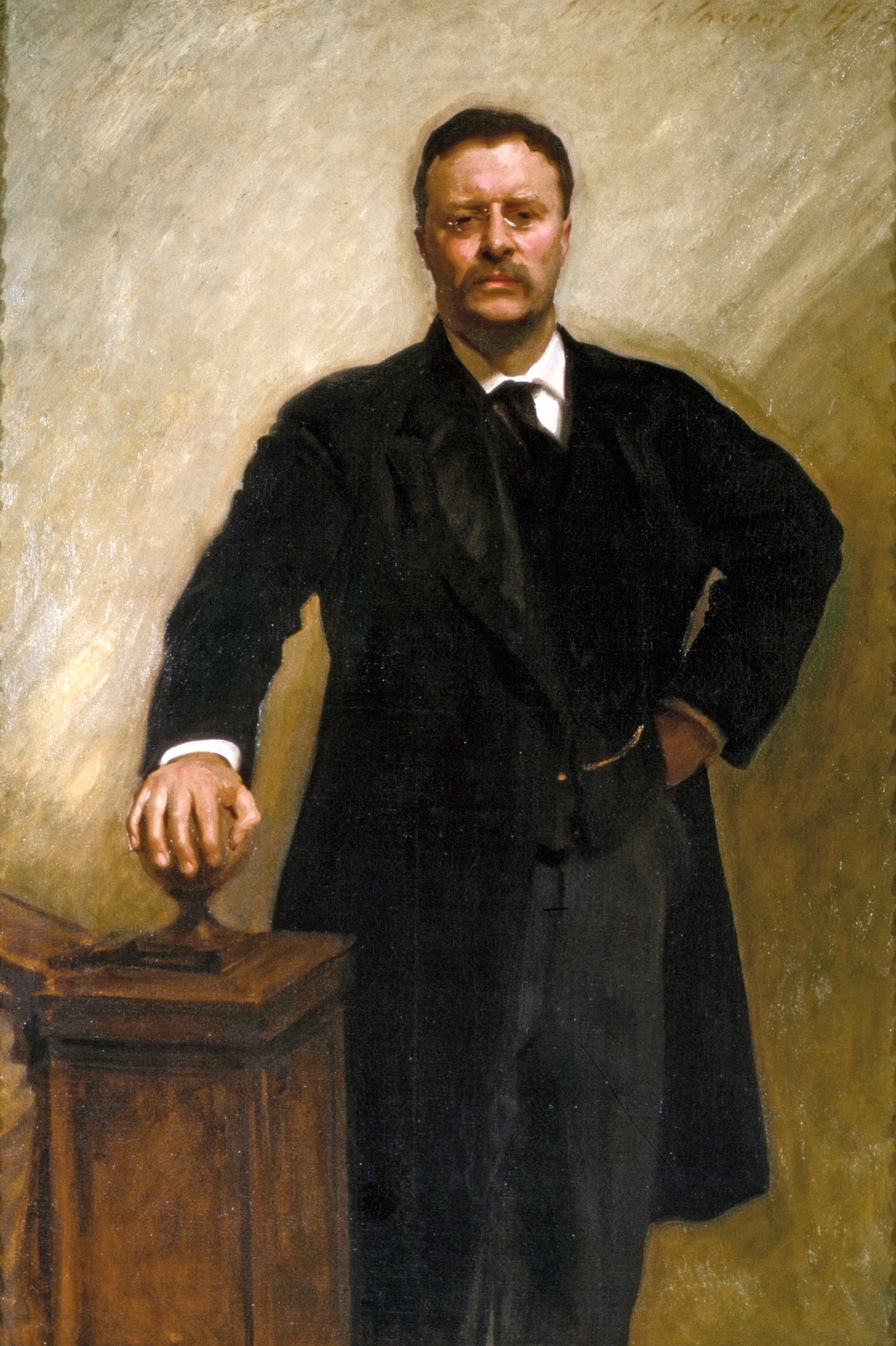
Official White House portrait of Roosevelt by John Singer Sargent in 1903

On September 6, 1901, President McKinley was attending the Pan-American Exposition in Buffalo, New York, when he was shot by anarchist Leon Czolgosz. Roosevelt, vacationing in Isle La Motte, Vermont, traveled to Buffalo to visit McKinley in the hospital. When McKinley seemed to recover, Roosevelt resumed his vacation. When McKinley's condition worsened, Roosevelt rushed back to Buffalo. He was in North Creek when he learned of McKinley's death on September 14. Roosevelt then continued to Buffalo and was sworn in as the 26th president at the Ansley Wilcox House.

McKinley's supporters were uneasy about Roosevelt, with Ohio Senator Mark Hanna particularly bitter, given his strong opposition at the convention. Although Roosevelt assured party leaders that he would adhere to McKinley's policies and retained his cabinet, he sought to establish himself as the party's leader and position himself for the 1904 election. Roosevelt's ascension to the presidency was met with concern by conservative Republicans, with historian Doris Kearns Goodwin noting that:

Conservatives, who had utterly dominated the Republican Party for three decades, feared the impulsive young president would prove a "bucking bronco," upsetting the alliance between business and government that had delivered unparalled prosperity at the turn of the century. Reformers hoped Roosevelt's vigorous leadership would refashion the Republican Party into the progressive force it had been under Abraham Lincoln, endeavoring to spread prosperity beyond the wealthy few to the common man.

Adding to this point, Kearns has noted that

Throughout his career, Roosevelt had struggled to reconcile party allegiance with the drive to address social problems, a balancing act that became more difficult as the troubling aspects of industrialization intensified. While he considered himself conservative in relation to the Populists, he believed that his party was in thrall to reactionaries who so "dreaded radicalism" that they "distrusted anything that was progressive." Precisely such men dominated both chambers of Congress, Roosevelt lamented. He would work to "push" them forward but recognized that genuine progress would require a direct appeal to the people, "the masters of both of us." To reach the general public, he would enlist the new breed of independent journalists, without whose "active support," he later acknowledged, he "would have been powerless."

Shortly after taking office, Roosevelt invited Booker T. Washington to dinner at the White House, sparking a bitter reaction across the heavily segregated South. While Roosevelt initially planned more dinners with Washington, he later avoided further invitations in favor of business appointments to retain political support in the white South.

=== Domestic policies: The Square Deal ===
When he assumed the presidency, Roosevelt reassured many fiscal conservatives, stating that "the mechanism of modern business is so delicate that extreme care must be taken not to interfere with it in a spirit of rashness or ignorance." The following year, Roosevelt asserted the president's independence from business interests by opposing the merger which created the Northern Securities Company, and many were surprised that any president, much less an unelected one, would challenge powerful banker J.P. Morgan. In his last two years as president, Roosevelt became increasingly distrustful of big business, despite its close ties to the Republican Party. Roosevelt sought to replace the 19th-century laissez-faire economic environment with a new economic model which included a larger regulatory role for the federal government, which was central to his political ideology of progressive conservatism. He believed that 19th-century entrepreneurs had risked their fortunes on innovations and new businesses, and that these capitalists had been rightly rewarded. By contrast, he believed that 20th-century capitalists risked little but nonetheless reaped huge and, given the lack of risk, unjust, economic rewards. Without a redistribution of wealth away from the upper class, Roosevelt feared that the country would turn to radicals or fall to revolution. His Square Deal domestic program had three main goals: conservation of natural resources, control of corporations, and consumer protection. The Square Deal evolved into his program of "New Nationalism", which emphasized the priority of labor over capital interests and a need to more effectively control corporate creation and combination, and proposed a ban on corporate political contributions.

==== Trust busting and regulation ====
Roosevelt was hailed as the "trust-buster" for his aggressive use of the 1890 Sherman Antitrust Act, compared to his predecessors. He viewed big business as essential to the American economy, prosecuting only "bad trusts" that restrained trade and charged unfair prices. Roosevelt brought 44 antitrust suits, breaking up the Northern Securities Company, the largest railroad monopoly, and regulating Standard Oil, the largest oil company. His predecessors, Benjamin Harrison, Grover Cleveland, and William McKinley, had together prosecuted only 18 antitrust violations.

After winning large majorities in the 1902 elections, Roosevelt proposed creating the United States Department of Commerce and Labor, which included the Bureau of Corporations. Congress was supportive of the department but skeptical of the antitrust powers Roosevelt wanted within the Bureau. In response, Roosevelt appealed to the public, pressuring Congress, which overwhelmingly passed his version of the bill.

House Speaker Joseph Gurney Cannon commented on Roosevelt's desire for executive branch control: "That fellow at the other end of the avenue wants everything from the birth of Christ to the death of the devil." Biographer Brands notes, "Even his friends occasionally wondered whether there wasn't any custom or practice too minor for him to try to regulate, update or otherwise improve." Roosevelt's willingness to exercise power extended to forcing retention of martial arts classes at the U.S. Naval Academy, revising disciplinary rules, altering the design of a disliked coin, and ordering simplified spellings for 300 words, though he rescinded the latter after ridicule from the press and a House protest.

Although Roosevelt was a supporter of the contribution American football had on the ''Strenuous Life'', by 1905, he threatened to ban the sport for excessive violence after a reported 19 player deaths and 137 serious injures in the preceding season, causing a number of colleges, including Stanford, to switch to rugby. As a compromise, he wrote to senior figures within the game, including the Harvard coach, to push for radical rule changes. This resulted in many of the modern rules of the game including the legalisation of the forward pass and the doubling of the first-down distance to 10 yards. Fatalities and injuries declined as a result in the following seasons.

==== Coal strike ====
In May 1902, anthracite coal miners went on strike, threatening a national energy shortage. After threatening the coal operators with federal troops, Roosevelt won their agreement to dispute arbitration by a commission, stopping the strike. The accord with J. P. Morgan resulted in miners getting more pay for fewer hours but no union recognition. Roosevelt said, "My action on labor should always be considered in connection with my action as regards capital, and both are reducible to my favorite formula—a square deal for every man." He was the first president to help settle a labor dispute.

==== Prosecuted misconduct ====
During Roosevelt's second year in office, corruption was uncovered in the Indian Service, the United States General Land Office, and the Post Office Department. He prosecuted corrupt Indian agents who had cheated Native American tribes out of land parcels. Land fraud and speculation involving Oregon timberlands led to him and Ethan A. Hitchcock forcing General Land Office Commissioner Binger Hermann from office in November 1902. Special prosecutor Francis J. Heney obtained 146 indictments in the Oregon Land Office bribery ring. Roosevelt also prosecuted 44 postal employees on charges of bribery and fraud. Historians agree he moved "quickly and decisively" to address misconduct in his administration.

==== Railroads ====
Merchants complained that some railroad rates were too high. In the 1906 Hepburn Act, Roosevelt sought to give the Interstate Commerce Commission (ICC) the power to regulate rates, but the Senate, led by conservative Nelson Aldrich, resisted. Roosevelt worked with Democratic Senator Benjamin Tillman to pass the bill. They ultimately reached a compromise that gave the ICC the power to replace existing rates with "just-and-reasonable" maximum rates, allowing railroads to appeal to federal courts on what was "reasonable". The Hepburn Act also granted the ICC regulatory power over pipeline fees, storage contracts, and other aspects of railroad operations.

==== Pure food and drugs ====
Roosevelt responded to public outrage over abuses in the food packing industry by pushing Congress to pass the Meat Inspection Act of 1906 and the Pure Food and Drug Act. Conservatives initially opposed the bill, but Upton Sinclair's The Jungle, published in 1906, galvanized support for reform. The Meat Inspection Act banned misleading labels and preservatives with harmful chemicals. The Pure Food and Drug Act banned impure or falsely labeled food and drugs from being made, sold, and shipped. Roosevelt served as honorary president of the American School Hygiene Association from 1907 to 1908 and convened the first White House Conference on the Care of Dependent Children in 1909.

==== Conservation ====
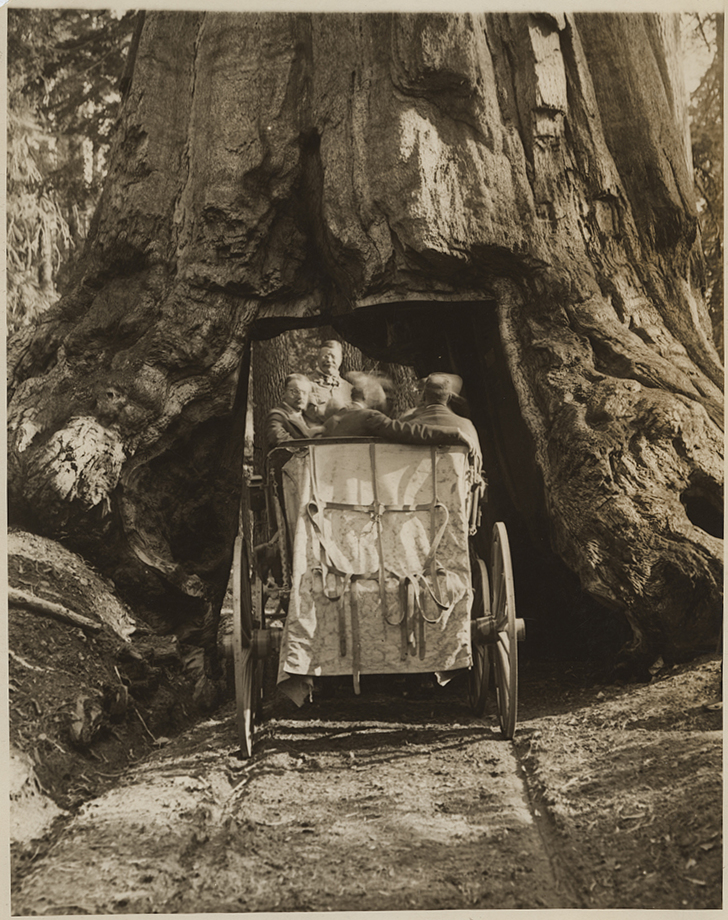
Roosevelt driving through a sequoia tree tunnel

Roosevelt was proudest of his work in conserving natural resources and extending federal protection to land and wildlife. He worked closely with Interior Secretary James Rudolph Garfield and Chief of the United States Forest Service Gifford Pinchot to enact a series of conservation programs that met resistance from Western Congress members, such as Charles William Fulton. Nonetheless, Roosevelt established the United States Forest Service, signed the creation of five National Parks, and signed the 1906 Antiquities Act, under which he proclaimed 18 new U.S. National Monuments. He also established the first 51 bird reserves, four game preserves, and 150 National Forests. The area of the United States he placed under public protection totals approximately 230 million acres (930,000 square kilometers). Roosevelt was the first honorary member of the Camp-Fire Club of America.

Roosevelt extensively used executive orders to protect forest and wildlife lands during his presidency. By the end of his second term, Roosevelt used executive orders to reserve 150 million acres (600,000 square kilometers) of forestry land. Roosevelt was unapologetic about his use of executive orders to protect the environment, despite Congress's perception that he was encroaching on too many lands. Eventually, Senator Charles Fulton attached an amendment to an agricultural appropriations bill preventing the president from reserving further land. Before signing the bill, Roosevelt established an additional 21 forest reserves, waiting until the last minute to sign it into law. In total, Roosevelt established 121 forest reserves in 31 states through executive orders. Roosevelt issued 1,081 executive orders, more than any previous president except for Grover Cleveland (253). The first 25 presidents issued a total of 1,262 executive orders.

==== Business panic of 1907 ====
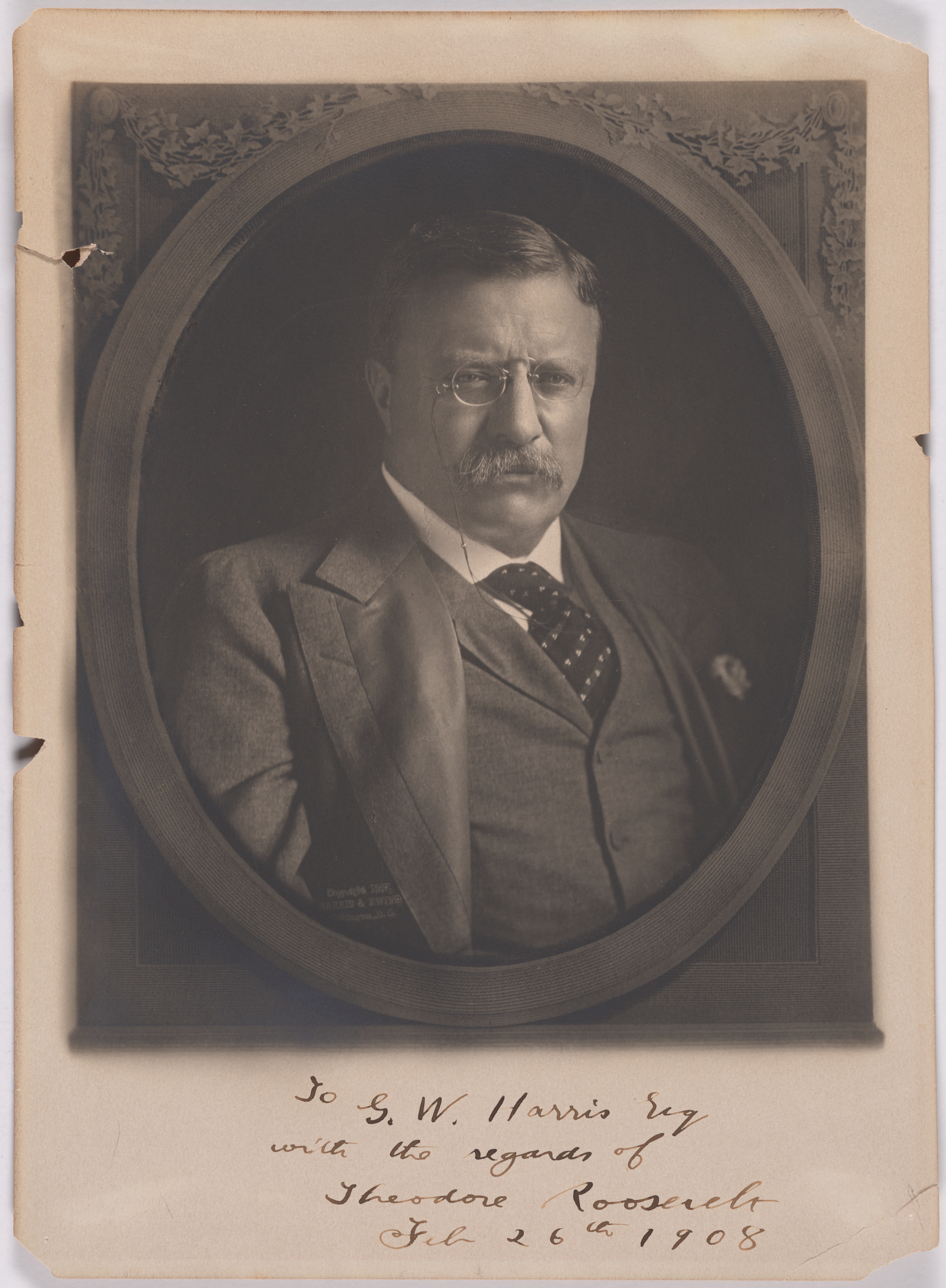
A 1907 portrait of Roosevelt by Harris & Ewing

In 1907, Roosevelt faced the greatest domestic economic crisis since the Panic of 1893. Wall Street's stock market entered a slump in early 1907, and many investors blamed Roosevelt's regulatory policies for the decline in stock prices. Roosevelt ultimately helped calm the crisis by meeting with the leaders of U.S. Steel on November 4, 1907, and approving their plan to purchase a Tennessee steel company near bankruptcy—its failure would ruin a major New York bank.

However, in August, Roosevelt had exploded in anger at the super-rich for their economic malfeasance, calling them "malefactors of great wealth" in a major speech, "The Puritan Spirit and the Regulation of Corporations". Trying to restore confidence, he blamed the crisis primarily on Europe, but then, after saluting the unbending rectitude of the Puritans, he went on:

It may well be that the determination of the government...to punish certain malefactors of great wealth, has been responsible for something of the trouble; at least to the extent of having caused these men to combine to bring about as much financial stress as possible, in order to discredit the policy of the government and thereby secure a reversal of that policy, so that they may enjoy unmolested the fruits of their own evil-doing.

Regarding the very wealthy, Roosevelt privately scorned, "their entire unfitness to govern the country, and ... the lasting damage they do by much of what they think are the legitimate big business operations of the day".

=== Foreign policy ===
In the analysis by Henry Kissinger, Roosevelt was the first president to develop the guideline that it was the duty of the United States to make its enormous power and potential influence felt globally. The idea of being a passive "city on the hill" model that others could look up to, he rejected. Roosevelt, trained in biology, was a social Darwinist who believed in survival of the fittest. The international world in his view was a realm of violence and conflict. The United States had all the economic and geographical potential to be the fittest nation on the globe. The United States had a duty to act decisively. For example, in terms of the Monroe Doctrine, the United States had to prevent European incursions in the Western Hemisphere. But there was more, as he expressed in his Roosevelt Corollary to the Monroe Doctrine: the U.S. had to be the policeman of the region because unruly, corrupt smaller nations had to be controlled, and if United States did not do it, European powers would in fact intervene and develop their own base of power in the hemisphere in contravention to the Monroe Doctrine.

Roosevelt was a conservative realist in his foreign policy approach. He deplored many of the increasingly popular idealistic liberal themes, such as were promoted by William Jennings Bryan, the anti-imperialists, and Woodrow Wilson. Kissinger says he rejected the efficacy of international law. Roosevelt argued that if a country could not protect its own interests, the international community could not help very much. He ridiculed disarmament proposals that were increasingly common. He saw no likelihood of an international power capable of checking wrongdoing on a major scale. As for world government:

I regard the Wilson–Bryan attitude of trusting to fantastic peace treaties, too impossible promises, to all kinds of scraps of paper without any backing in efficient force, as abhorrent. It is infinitely better for a nation and for the world to have the Frederick the Great and Bismarck tradition as regards foreign policy than to have the Bryan or Bryan–Wilson attitude as a permanent national attitude.... A milk-and-water righteousness unbacked by force is...as wicked as and even more mischievous than force divorced from righteousness.

On his international outlook, Roosevelt favored spheres of influence, whereby one great power would generally prevail, such as the United States in the Western Hemisphere or Great Britain in the Indian subcontinent. Japan fit that role and he approved. However, he had deep distrust of both Germany and Russia.

==== Japan ====
The American annexation of Hawaii in 1898 was stimulated in part by fear that Japan would dominate or seize the Hawaiian Republic. Similarly, Germany was the alternative to American takeover of the Philippines in 1900, and Tokyo strongly preferred the U.S. to take over. As the U.S. became a naval world power, it needed to find a way to avoid a military confrontation in the Pacific with Japan.

In the 1890s, Roosevelt had been an ardent imperialist and vigorously defended the permanent acquisition of the Philippines in the 1900 campaign. After the local insurrection ended in 1902, Roosevelt wished to have a strong U.S. presence in the region as a symbol of democratic values, but he did not envision any new acquisitions. One of Roosevelt's priorities was the maintenance of friendly relations with Japan. From 1904 to 1905 Japan and Russia were at war. Both sides asked Roosevelt to mediate a peace conference, held successfully in Portsmouth, New Hampshire. Roosevelt won the Nobel Peace Prize for his efforts.

Though he proclaimed that the United States would be neutral during the Russo-Japanese War, Roosevelt secretly favored Imperial Japan to emerge victorious against the Russian Empire. In California, anti-Japanese hostility was growing, and Tokyo protested. Roosevelt negotiated a "Gentleman's Agreement" in 1907. It ended explicit discrimination against the Japanese, and Japan agreed not to allow unskilled immigrants into the United States. The Great White Fleet of American battleships visited Japan in 1908. Roosevelt intended to emphasize the superiority of the American fleet over the smaller Japanese navy, but instead of resentment, the visitors arrived to a joyous welcome. This goodwill facilitated the Root–Takahira Agreement of November 1908 which reaffirmed the status quo of Japanese control of Korea and American control of the Philippines.

==== China ====
Following the Boxer Rebellion, foreign powers, including the United States, required China to pay indemnities as part of the Boxer protocol. In 1908, Roosevelt appropriated these indemnities for the Boxer Indemnity Scholarships, which funded tens of thousands of Chinese students to study in the U.S. over the next 40 years.

==== Europe ====
Success in the war against Spain and the new empire, plus having the largest economy in the world, meant that the United States had emerged as a world power. Roosevelt searched for ways to win recognition for the position abroad. He also played a major role in mediating the First Moroccan Crisis by calling the Algeciras Conference, which averted war between France and Germany.

Roosevelt's presidency saw the strengthening of ties with Great Britain. The Great Rapprochement had begun with British support of the United States during the Spanish–American War, and it continued as Britain withdrew its fleet from the Caribbean in favor of directing most of its attention to the rising German naval threat. In 1901, Britain and the U.S. signed the Hay–Pauncefote Treaty, abrogating the Clayton–Bulwer Treaty, which had prevented the U.S. from constructing a canal connecting the Pacific and the Atlantic Ocean. The long-standing Alaska boundary dispute was settled on terms favorable to the U.S.; as Roosevelt later put it, this "settled the last serious trouble between the British Empire and ourselves."

==== Latin America and the Panama Canal ====
As president, Roosevelt primarily directed the nation's overseas ambitions towards the Caribbean, especially locations that had a bearing on the defense of his pet project, the Panama Canal. Roosevelt also increased the size of the navy, and by the end of his second term, the U.S. had more battleships than any country other than Britain. The Panama Canal, when it opened in 1914, allowed the U.S. Navy to rapidly move back and forth from the Pacific to the Caribbean to European waters.

In December 1902, the Germans, British, and Italians blockaded the ports of Venezuela to force the repayment of delinquent loans. Roosevelt was particularly concerned about the motives of German Emperor Wilhelm II. He succeeded in getting the three nations to agree to arbitration by tribunal at The Hague, and successfully defused the crisis. The latitude granted to the Europeans by the arbiters was in part responsible for the "Roosevelt Corollary" to the Monroe Doctrine, which the President issued in 1904:

Chronic wrongdoing or an impotence which results in a general loosening of the ties of civilized society, may in America, as elsewhere, ultimately require intervention by some civilized nation, and in the Western Hemisphere, the adherence of the United States to the Monroe doctrine may force the United States, however reluctantly, in flagrant cases of such wrongdoing or impotence, to the exercise of an international police power.

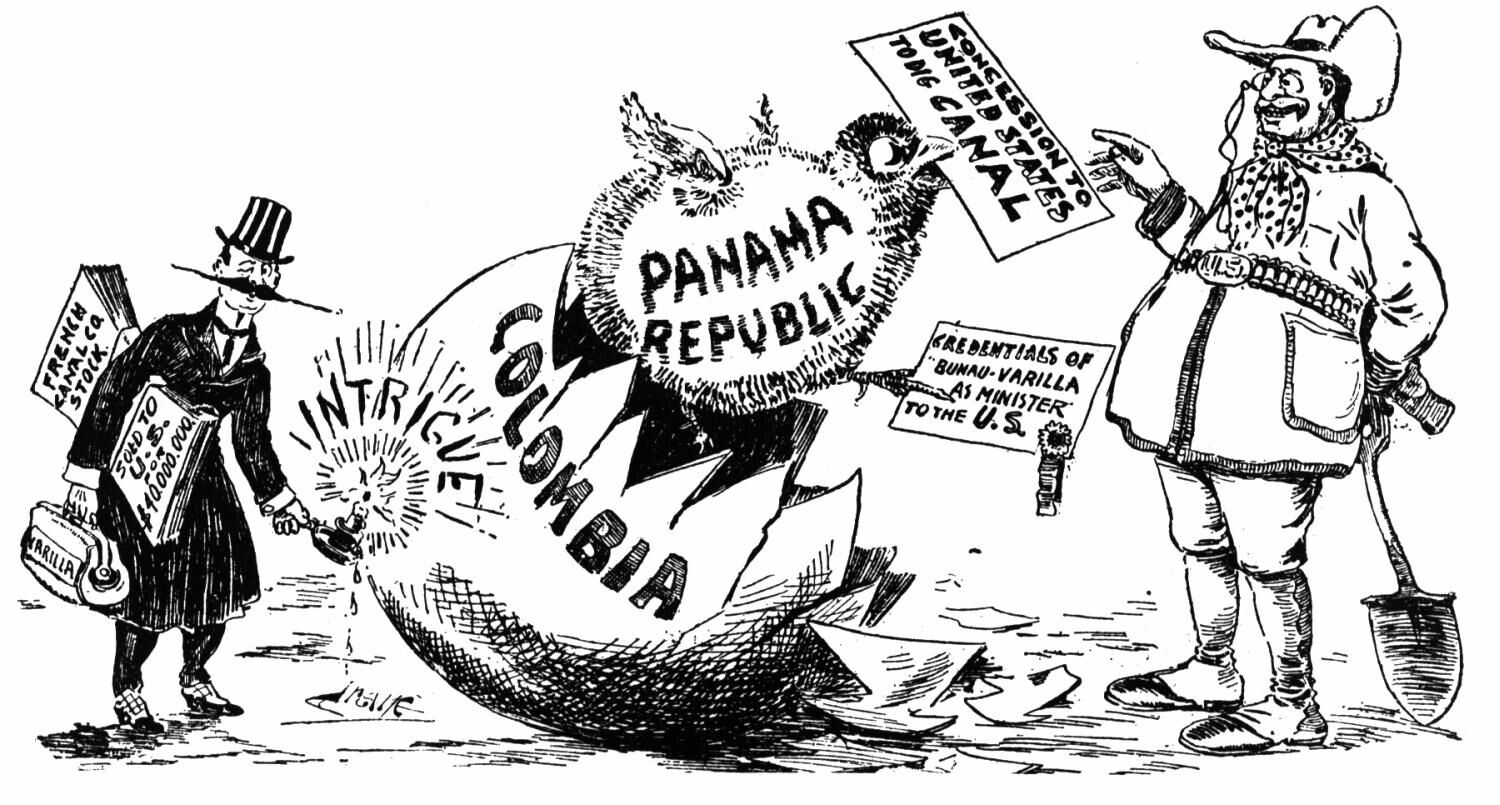
Roosevelt felt American dominance of the region was essential to building the Panama Canal. He used military dominance to ensure Panama successfully revolted and achieved independence in 1903.

Two possible routes for an isthmus canal in Central America were under consideration: through Nicaragua and through Panama, which was then a rebellious district within Colombia. Roosevelt persuaded Congress to approve the Panamanian alternative, and a treaty was approved, only to be rejected by the Colombian government. When the Panamanians learned of this, a rebellion followed, was supported by Roosevelt, and succeeded. A treaty with the new Panama government for construction of the canal was reached in 1903. Roosevelt received criticism for paying the bankrupt Panama Canal Company and the New Panama Canal Company $40 million (equivalent to $1.15 billion in 2025) for the rights and equipment to build the canal. Critics charged that an American investor syndicate divided the large payment among themselves. There was also controversy over whether a French company engineer influenced Roosevelt in choosing the Panama route for the canal over the Nicaragua route. Roosevelt denied charges of corruption. In January 1909, Roosevelt, in an unprecedented move, brought criminal libel charges against the New York World and the Indianapolis News known as the "Roosevelt-Panama Libel Cases". Both cases were dismissed by U.S. District Courts, and on January 3, 1911, the U.S. Supreme Court upheld the lower courts' rulings. Historians are sharply critical of Roosevelt's criminal prosecutions of the newspapers but are divided on whether actual corruption took place.

In 1906, following a disputed election, an insurrection ensued in Cuba; Roosevelt sent Taft, the Secretary of War, to monitor the situation; he was convinced that he had the authority to unilaterally authorize Taft to deploy Marines, if necessary, without congressional approval.

Examining the work of numerous scholars, Ricard reports that:

The most striking evolution in the twenty-first-century historiography of Theodore Roosevelt is the switch from a partial arraignment of the imperialist to a quasi-unanimous celebration of the master diplomatist.... [Recent works] have underlined cogently Roosevelt's exceptional statesmanship in the construction of the nascent twentieth-century "special relationship". ...The twenty-sixth president's reputation as a brilliant diplomatist and real politician has undeniably reached new heights in the twenty-first century... yet, his Philippine policy still prompts criticism.

On November 6, 1906, Roosevelt was the first president to depart the continental United States on an official diplomatic trip. Roosevelt made a 17-day trip to Panama and Puerto Rico. He visited the Panama Canal worksite and attended diplomatic receptions in both Panama and Puerto Rico.

=== Media ===
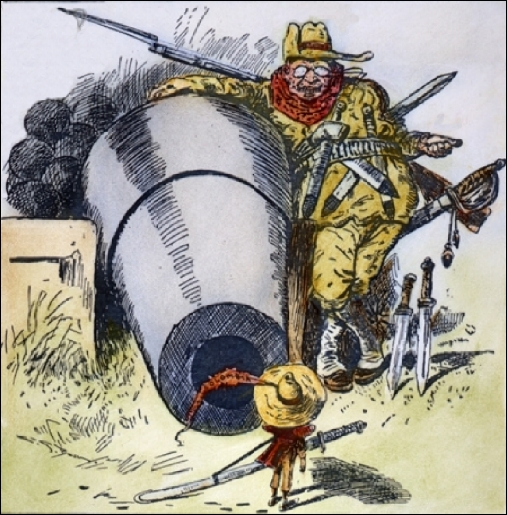
A 1903 cartoon, "Go Away, Little Man, and Don't Bother Me", depicting Roosevelt intimidating Colombia to acquire the Panama Canal Zone

Building on McKinley's effective use of the press, Roosevelt made the White House the center of news every day, providing interviews and photo opportunities. After noticing the reporters huddled outside the White House in the rain one day, he gave them their own room inside, effectively inventing the presidential press briefing. The grateful press, with unprecedented access to the White House, rewarded Roosevelt with ample coverage. Aside from the Roosevelt-Panama Libel Cases, Roosevelt normally enjoyed very close relationships with the press. While out of office, he made a living as a writer and magazine editor. He loved talking with intellectuals, authors, and writers. He drew the line, however, at exposé-oriented scandal-mongering journalists who, during his term, sent magazine subscriptions soaring by their attacks on corrupt politicians, mayors, and corporations. Roosevelt himself was not usually a target, but a speech of his from 1906 coined the term "muckraker" for unscrupulous journalists making wild charges.

=== 1904 presidential election ===
Electoral College results of the 1904 election

With the waning of Thomas Platt's power, Roosevelt faced little effective opposition for the 1904 nomination. In deference to Mark Hanna's conservative loyalists, Roosevelt at first offered the party chairmanship to Cornelius Bliss, but he declined. Roosevelt turned to his own man, George B. Cortelyou of New York, the first Secretary of Commerce and Labor. To buttress his hold on the party's nomination, Roosevelt made it clear that anyone opposing Cortelyou would be considered opposing the President. The President secured his own nomination, but his preferred vice-presidential running mate, Robert R. Hitt, was not nominated. Senator Charles Warren Fairbanks of Indiana, a favorite of conservatives, gained the nomination.

While Roosevelt followed the tradition of incumbents in not actively campaigning on the stump, he sought to control the campaign's message through specific instructions to Cortelyou. He also attempted to manage the press's release of White House statements by forming the Ananias Club. Any journalist who repeated a statement made by the president without approval was penalized by restriction of further access.

The Democratic Party's nominee in 1904 was Alton Brooks Parker. Democratic newspapers charged that Republicans were extorting large campaign contributions from corporations, putting ultimate responsibility on Roosevelt himself. Roosevelt denied corruption while at the same time ordering Cortelyou to return $100,000 (equivalent to $2.8 million in 2025) of a campaign contribution from Standard Oil. Parker said that Roosevelt was accepting corporate donations to keep damaging information from the Bureau of Corporations from going public. Roosevelt strongly denied Parker's charge and responded that he would "go into the Presidency unhampered by any pledge, promise, or understanding of any kind, sort, or description...". Allegations from Parker and the Democrats, however, had little impact on the election, as Roosevelt promised to give every American a "square deal". Roosevelt won 56% of the popular vote to Parker's 38%, and won the Electoral College vote 336 to 140. Before his inauguration ceremony, Roosevelt declared that he would not serve another term. Democrats would continue to charge Roosevelt and the Republicans of being influenced by corporate donations.

=== Second term ===
As his second term progressed, Roosevelt moved to the left of his Republican Party base and called for a series of reforms, most of which Congress failed to pass. Roosevelt's influence waned as he approached the end of his second term, which he promised to not run again after its conclusion, and his concentration of power provoked a backlash from many Congressmen. He sought a national incorporation law, called for a federal income tax (despite the Supreme Court's ruling in Pollock v. Farmers' Loan & Trust Co.), and an inheritance tax. Roosevelt called for limits on the use of court injunctions against labor unions during strikes; injunctions were a powerful weapon that mostly helped business. He wanted an employee liability law for industrial injuries (pre-empting state laws) and an eight-hour work day for federal employees. In other areas, he also sought a postal savings system (to provide competition for local banks), and he asked for campaign reform laws.

The election of 1904 continued to be a source of contention between Republicans and Democrats. A Congressional investigation in 1905 revealed that corporate executives donated tens of thousands of dollars in 1904 to the Republican National Committee. In 1908, a month before the general presidential election, Governor Charles N. Haskell of Oklahoma, former Democratic Treasurer, said that Senators beholden to Standard Oil lobbied Roosevelt, in the summer of 1904, to authorize the leasing of Indian oil lands by Standard Oil subsidiaries. He said Roosevelt overruled his Secretary of the Interior Ethan A. Hitchcock and granted a pipeline franchise to run through the Osage lands to the Prairie Oil and Gas Company. The New York Sun made a similar accusation and said that Standard Oil, a refinery that financially benefited from the pipeline, had contributed $150,000 to the Republicans in 1904 (equivalent to $4.2 million in 2025) after Roosevelt's alleged reversal allowing the pipeline franchise. Roosevelt branded Haskell's allegation as "a lie, pure and simple".

==== Rhetoric of righteousness ====
Roosevelt's rhetoric was characterized by an intense moralism of personal righteousness. The tone was typified by his denunciation of "predatory wealth" in a message he sent Congress in January 1908 calling for passage of new labor laws:

Predatory wealth--of the wealth accumulated on a giant scale by all forms of iniquity, ranging from the oppression of wageworkers to unfair and unwholesome methods of crushing out competition, and to defrauding the public by stock jobbing and the manipulation of securities. Certain wealthy men of this stamp, whose conduct should be abhorrent to every man of ordinarily decent conscience, and who commit the hideous wrong of teaching our young men that phenomenal business success must ordinarily be based on dishonesty, have during the last few months made it apparent that they have banded together to work for a reaction. Their endeavor is to overthrow and discredit all who honestly administer the law, to prevent any additional legislation which would check and restrain them, and to secure if possible a freedom from all restraint which will permit every unscrupulous wrongdoer to do what he wishes unchecked provided he has enough money....The methods by which the Standard Oil people and those engaged in the other combinations of which I have spoken above have achieved great fortunes can only be justified by the advocacy of a system of morality which would also justify every form of criminality on the part of a labor union, and every form of violence, corruption, and fraud, from murder to bribery and ballot box stuffing in politics.

=== Roosevelt and racial issues ===
During the Progressive Era of 1890–1919, the political and social status of African Americans in both the South and the North were at their lowest point, representing a post-Civil War nadir. Roosevelt did not personally display the level of racial animus that others of the era did. He included black soldiers in his Rough Rider unit in 1898. He invited the nation's leading Black spokesman, Booker T. Washington, to dinner at the White House in October 1901, and routinely took Washington's advice in how to distribute patronage jobs to Black Republicans.

Despite such outreach, however, he supported the downward trend.

During a southern tour in 1905 he admonished the African American voters to accept white supremacy and boasted to whites that his mother was from Georgia. In the middle of his second term the President dismissed an entire battalion of black soldiers who colluded and refused to obey his explicit orders to report the names of soldiers who attacked white civilians in Brownsville, Texas. In 1912 when launching the Bull Moose Party, he mobilized only white men in the South, while President Taft was mobilizing both races there.

=== 1908 presidential election ===
Roosevelt enjoyed being president but believed limited terms provided a check against dictatorship. He decided to honor his 1904 pledge not to run for a third term. Though he favored Secretary of State Elihu Root as his successor, Root's ill health made him unsuitable. New York Governor Charles Evans Hughes was a strong candidate and shared Roosevelt's progressivism, but Roosevelt considered him too independent. He settled on his Secretary of War, William Howard Taft, who had been his friend since 1890 and consistently supported Roosevelt's policies. Roosevelt was determined to install the successor of his choice, and wrote to Taft: "Dear Will: Do you want any action about those federal officials? I will break their necks with the utmost cheerfulness if you say the word!" Just weeks later, he branded as "false and malicious" the charge he was using the offices at his disposal to favor Taft. At the 1908 Republican convention, many chanted "four years more" of a Roosevelt presidency, but Taft won the nomination after Henry Cabot Lodge made it clear Roosevelt was not interested.

In the 1908 election, Taft easily defeated Democratic nominee William Jennings Bryan. Taft promoted progressivism emphasizing the rule of law; he preferred that judges, rather than politicians, make decisions about fairness. However, Taft proved to be a less adroit politician than Roosevelt, lacking the energy, personal magnetism, and public support that made Roosevelt so formidable. When Roosevelt realized lowering the tariff would create severe tensions inside the Republican Party, he stopped talking about it. Taft, ignoring the risks, tackled the tariff boldly, resulting in the Payne-Aldrich Tariff of 1909, which alienated reformers on all sides. While the crisis was building inside the Party, Roosevelt was touring Africa and Europe, allowing Taft space.

== Post-presidency (1909–1919) ==
=== Presidential election of 1912 ===
==== Republican primaries and convention ====
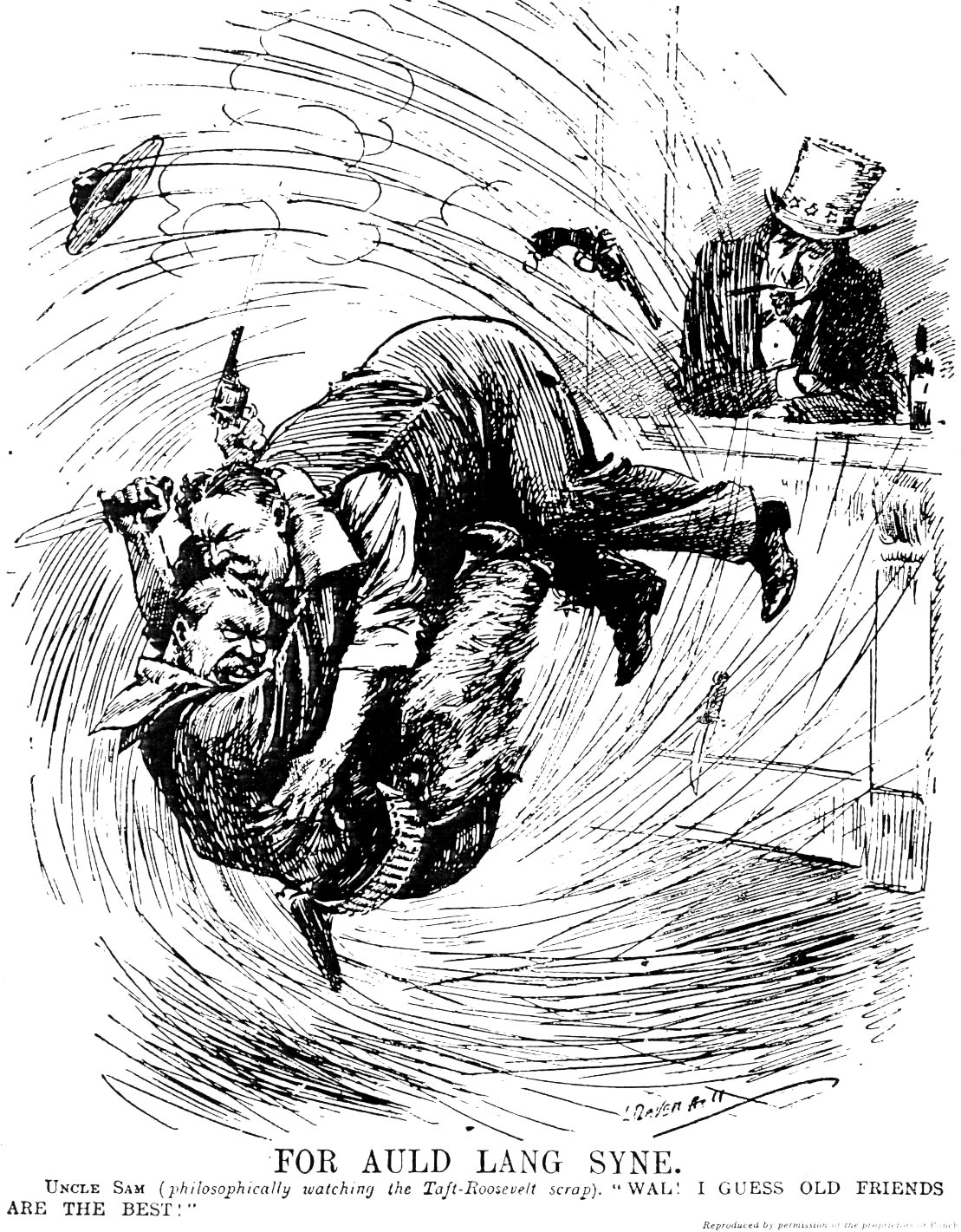
Punch in May 1912, depicting no-holds-barred fight between William Howard Taft and Roosevelt

In November 1911, a group of Ohio Republicans endorsed Roosevelt for the party's nomination for president. Roosevelt conspicuously declined to refuse a nomination. Soon thereafter, Roosevelt said, "I am really sorry for Taft... I am sure he means well, but he means well feebly, and he does not know how! He is utterly unfit for leadership and this is a time when we need leadership." In January 1912, Roosevelt declared "if the people make a draft on me I shall not decline to serve". Roosevelt spoke before the Constitutional Convention in Ohio, identifying as a progressive and endorsing progressive reforms—even endorsing popular review of state judicial decisions. In reaction to Roosevelt's proposals Taft said, "Such extremists are not progressives—they are political emotionalists or neurotics".

Roosevelt began to envision himself as the savior of the party from defeat in the upcoming election. In February 1912 in Boston, Roosevelt said, "I will accept the nomination for president if it is tendered to me". Elihu Root and Henry Cabot Lodge thought division would lead to defeat in the election, while Taft believed he would be defeated either in the primary or general election.

The 1912 primaries represented the first extensive use of the presidential primary, a reform achievement of the progressive movement. The Republican primaries in the South, where party regulars dominated, went for Taft, as did New York, Indiana, Michigan, Kentucky, and Massachusetts. Meanwhile, Roosevelt won in Illinois, Minnesota, Nebraska, South Dakota, California, Maryland, Ohio, and Pennsylvania. At the 1912 Republican National Convention in Chicago, Taft won the nomination on the first ballot.

According to Lewis L. Gould, in 1912

Roosevelt saw Taft as the agent of "the forces of reaction and of political crookedness".... Roosevelt had become the most dangerous man in American history, said Taft, "because of his hold upon the less intelligent voters and the discontented." The Republican National Committee, dominated by the Taft forces, awarded 235 delegates to the president and 19 to Roosevelt...Roosevelt believed himself entitled to 72 delegates from Arizona, California, Texas and Washington that had been given to Taft. Firm in his conviction that the nomination was being stolen from him, Roosevelt ....told cheering supporters that there was "a great moral issue" at stake and he should have "sixty to eighty lawfully elected delegates" added to his total....Roosevelt ended his speech declaring: "Fearless of the future; unheeding of our individual fates; with unflinching hearts and undimmed eyes; we stand at Armageddon, and we battle for the Lord!"

==== Progressive Party ====
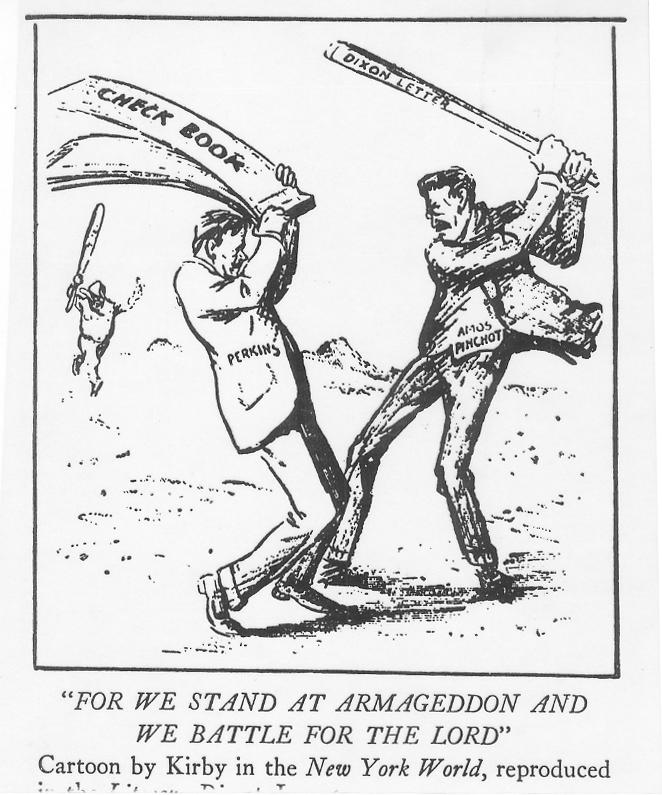
A 1912 cartoon depicting George Perkins (left, with checkbook symbolizing control of money) and Amos Pinchot (wielding an endorsement from Roosevelt campaign manager Senator Joseph M. Dixon) in battle for Progressive Party control

Once his defeat appeared probable, Roosevelt announced he would "accept the progressive nomination on a progressive platform and I shall fight to the end, win or lose". Roosevelt prophetically said, "My feeling is that the Democrats will probably win if they nominate a progressive". Roosevelt left the Republican Party and created the Progressive Party. Leadership of the new party included a range of reformers. Jane Addams campaigned vigorously for the party as a breakthrough in social reform. Gifford Pinchot represented environmentalists and anti-trust crusaders. Publisher Frank Munsey provided cash and George W. Perkins, a Wall Street financier came from the efficiency movement. He handled the new party's finances efficiently but was distrusted by many reformers.

Governor Hiram Johnson controlled the California party, forcing out the Taft supporters. He was nominated as Roosevelt's running mate. Roosevelt's platform echoed his radical 1907–1908 proposals, calling for vigorous government intervention to protect the people from selfish interests:

To destroy this invisible Government, to dissolve the unholy alliance between corrupt business and corrupt politics is the first task of the statesmanship of the day. This country belongs to the people. Its resources, its business, its laws, its institutions, should be utilized, maintained, or altered in whatever manner will best promote the general interest. This assertion is explicit... Mr. Wilson must know that every monopoly in the United States opposes the Progressive party... I challenge him... to name the monopoly that did support the Progressive party, whether... the Sugar Trust, the US Steel Trust, the Harvester Trust, the Standard Oil Trust, the Tobacco Trust, or any other... Ours was the only program to which they objected, and they supported either Mr. Wilson or Mr. Taft.

Though many Progressive party activists in the North opposed the steady loss of civil rights for blacks, Roosevelt ran a "lily-white" campaign in the South. Rival all-white and all-black delegations from southern states arrived at the Progressive national convention, and Roosevelt decided to seat the all-white delegations. Nevertheless, he won few votes outside traditional Republican strongholds. Out of 1,100 counties in the South, Roosevelt won two counties in Alabama, one in Arkansas, seven in North Carolina, three in Georgia, 17 in Tennessee, two in Texas, one in Virginia, and none in Florida, Louisiana, Mississippi, or South Carolina.

==== Attempted assassination ====
On October 14, 1912, while arriving at a campaign event in Milwaukee, Roosevelt was shot by saloonkeeper John Schrank, who believed the ghost of assassinated president William McKinley had directed him to kill Roosevelt. The bullet lodged in Roosevelt's chest after penetrating his eyeglass case and passing through a 50-page folded copy of the speech titled "Progressive Cause Greater Than Any Individual". Schrank was disarmed and captured by Roosevelt's stenographer, Elbert E. Martin as he attempted to fire a second time, and might have been lynched had Roosevelt not shouted for Schrank to remain unharmed. Roosevelt assured the crowd he was all right, then ordered police to take Schrank and make sure no violence was done to him.

As an experienced hunter and anatomist, Roosevelt correctly concluded that since he was not coughing blood, the bullet had not reached his lung. He declined to go to hospital immediately and instead delivered a 90-minute speech with blood seeping into his shirt. Only afterwards did he accept medical attention. Probes and an x-ray showed the bullet had lodged in Roosevelt's chest muscle, but did not penetrate the pleura. Doctors concluded it would be less dangerous to leave it than attempt to remove it, and Roosevelt carried the bullet in him for the rest of his life. Taft and Democratic nominee Woodrow Wilson suspended their campaigning until Roosevelt resumed his. When asked if the shooting would affect his election campaign, he said to the reporter "I'm fit as a bull moose." The bull moose became a symbol of Roosevelt and the Progressive Party, and it often was referred to as the Bull Moose Party. He spent two weeks recuperating before returning to campaign. He wrote a friend about the bullet, "I do not mind it any more than if it were in my waistcoat-pocket."

==== Democratic victory ====
After the Democrats nominated Governor Woodrow Wilson, Roosevelt did not expect to win the election, as Wilson had compiled a record attractive to progressive Democrats who might have considered voting for Roosevelt. Roosevelt still campaigned vigorously, and the election developed into a two-person contest despite Taft's quiet presence. Roosevelt respected Wilson, but they differed on various issues; Wilson opposed federal intervention regarding women's suffrage or child labor, and attacked Roosevelt's tolerance of large businesses.

Roosevelt won 4.1 million votes (27%), compared to Taft's 3.5 million (23%) and Wilson's 6.3 million (42%). Wilson scored a landslide in the Electoral College with 435 electoral votes; Roosevelt 88, and Taft 8. Pennsylvania was the only eastern state won by Roosevelt; in the Midwest, he carried Michigan, Minnesota, and South Dakota; in the West, California, and Washington. Roosevelt garnered a higher share of the popular vote than any other third-party presidential candidate in history and won the most states of any third-party candidate after the Civil War.

=== The Great Rapprochement with Great Britain ===
The Great Rapprochement was the convergence of diplomatic, political, military, and economic objectives of the United States and Great Britain from 1895 to 1915. Roosevelt played a central role through his close contacts with British intellectuals and politicians and in his diplomatic work regarding the Panama Canal. The British welcomed Roosevelt, as seen in the Alaska boundary dispute. The British diplomats voted with Roosevelt's diplomats to deny Canada's claim to an ocean port that would allow access to the gold mines in the Canadian Yukon. The Canadians felt betrayed by the British control of Canadian foreign policy in order to appease the United States.

In 1915–1917 Roosevelt was the leading proponent of America entering the war on the side of Great Britain. In October 1916, campaigning for the Republican ticket to defeat President Woodrow Wilson's reelection, Roosevelt lashed out:

President Wilson's ignoble shirking of responsibility has been clothed in an utterly misleading phrase, the phrase of a coward, He kept us out of war. In actual reality, war has been creeping nearer and nearer... and we face it without policy, plan, purpose or preparation.

Roosevelt argued that the United States had a moral obligation to support the Allies and that neutrality, as President Wilson promised, was both cowardly and dangerous.

=== Republican Party schism ===
Roosevelt had attempted to refashion Taft into a copy of himself, but recoiled as Taft began to display his individuality. He was offended on election night when Taft indicated his success had been possible not just through Roosevelt, but also Taft's half-brother Charles Phelps Taft. Roosevelt was further alienated when Taft did not consult him about cabinet appointments. Roosevelt and other progressives were ideologically dissatisfied over Taft's conservation policies and his handling of the tariff, when he concentrated power with conservative party leaders in Congress. Others have argued that Taft abided by the goals and procedures of the "Square Deal" promoted by Roosevelt in his first term. The problem was Roosevelt and the more radical progressives had moved on to more aggressive goals, such as curbing the judiciary, which Taft rejected.

Roosevelt urged progressives to take control of the Republican Party, and to avoid splitting it in a way that would hand the presidency to the Democrats in 1912. To that end, Roosevelt publicly expressed optimism about the Taft Administration after meeting with the president in June 1910.

==== Dispute over court power ====
Roosevelt gave speeches in the West in the late summer and early fall of 1910 in which he severely criticized the nation's judiciary. Roosevelt not only attacked the Supreme Court's 1905 decision in Lochner v. New York, he accused federal courts of undermining democracy, branding the suspect jurists "fossilized judges", and compared their tendency to strike down progressive reform legislation, to Justice Roger B. Taney's ruling in Dred Scott v. Sandford (1857). To ensure the constitution served the public interests, Roosevelt joined other progressives in calling for the "judicial recall", which would enable popular majorities to remove judges from office and reverse unpopular judicial decisions. This attack horrified Taft, who, though he privately agreed that Lochner and other decisions had been poorly decided, was an adamant believer in judicial authority preserving constitutional government. His horror was shared with other prominent members of the elite legal community, and solidified in Taft's mind that Roosevelt must not be permitted to regain the presidency.

==== Roosevelt's "New Nationalism" ====
Roosevelt after leaving office in October 1910

In August 1910, Roosevelt escalated the rivalry with a speech at Osawatomie, Kansas, which was the most radical of his career. It marked his public break with Taft and conservative Republicans. Advocating a program he called the "New Nationalism", Roosevelt emphasized the priority of labor over capital interests and the need to control corporate creation and combination. He called for a ban on corporate political contributions. Returning to New York, Roosevelt began a battle to take control of the state Republican party from William Barnes Jr.. Taft had pledged his support to Roosevelt in this endeavor, and Roosevelt was outraged when Taft's support failed to materialize at the 1910 state convention. Roosevelt campaigned for the Republicans in the 1910 elections, in which the Democrats gained control of the House for the first time since 1892. Among the newly elected Democrats was New York State senator Franklin D. Roosevelt, who argued he represented his distant cousin's policies better than his Republican opponent.

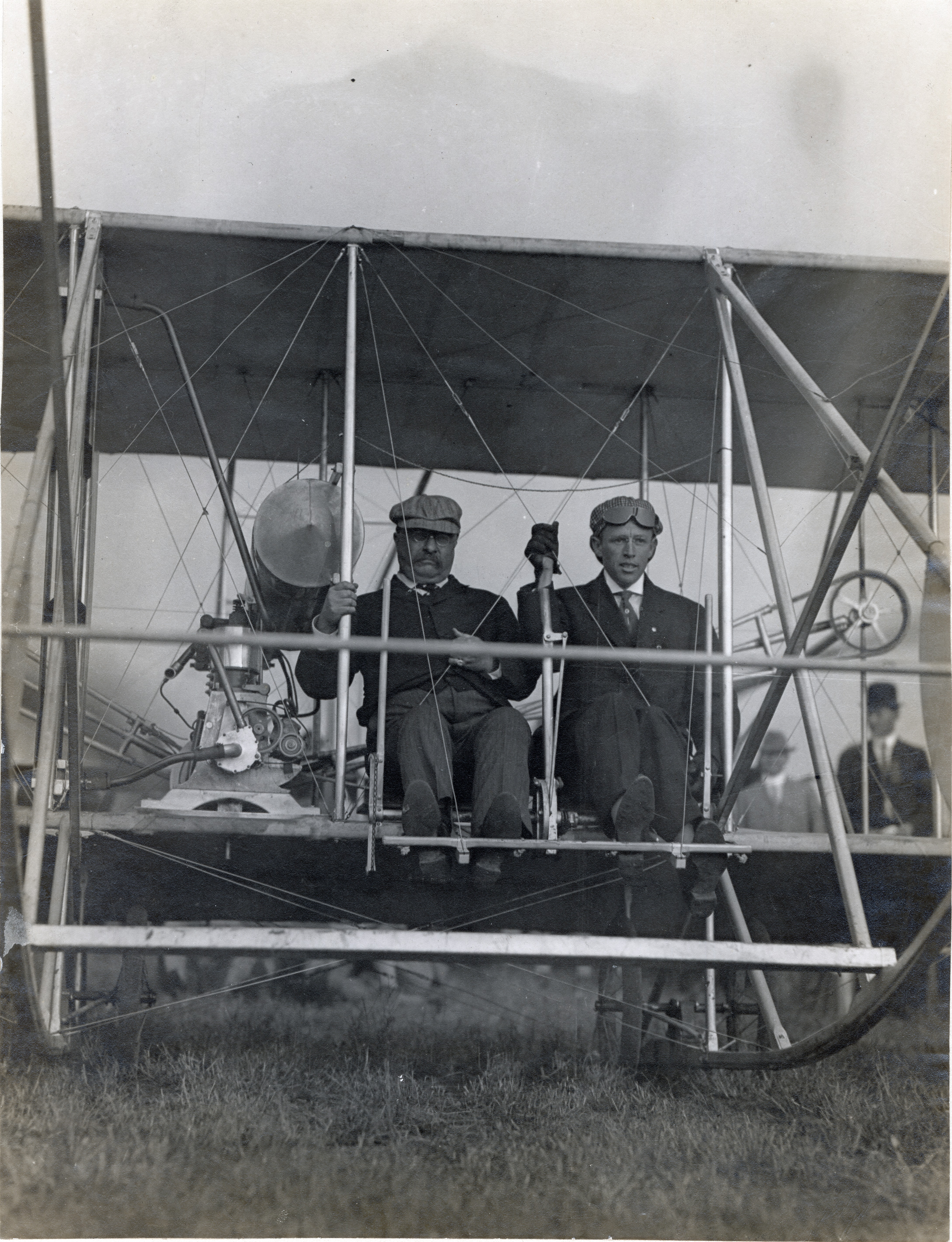
Roosevelt and pilot Archibald Hoxsey in St. Louis in October 1910

The Republican progressives interpreted the defeats as a compelling argument for reorganization of the party in 1911. Senator Robert M. La Follette joined with Pinchot, William White, and California Governor Hiram Johnson to create the National Progressive Republican League; their objectives were to defeat the power of political bossism at the state level and replace Taft at the national level. Despite his skepticism of the league, Roosevelt expressed general support for progressive principles. Between January and April 1911, Roosevelt wrote articles for The Outlook, defending what he called "the great movement of our day, the progressive nationalist movement against special privilege, and in favor of an honest and efficient political and industrial democracy". With Roosevelt apparently uninterested in running in 1912, La Follette declared his own candidacy in June 1911. Roosevelt continually criticized Taft after the 1910 elections, and the break between them became final after the Justice Department filed an antitrust lawsuit against US Steel in September 1911; Roosevelt was humiliated because he had personally approved an acquisition the Justice Department was now challenging. However, Roosevelt was still unwilling to run against Taft in 1912; he hoped to run in 1916 against whichever Democrat beat Taft in 1912.

==== Battling Taft over arbitration treaties ====
Taft as a world leader arbitrated for world peace. In 1911 he and Secretary of State Philander C. Knox negotiated treaties with Britain and France providing that differences be arbitrated. Disputes had to be submitted to the Hague Court or another tribunal. These were signed in August 1911, but had to be ratified by a two-thirds vote of the Senate. Neither Taft nor Knox consulted with Senate leaders during negotiations. By then many Republicans were opposed to Taft, and the president felt lobbying too hard for the treaties might cause their defeat. He made speeches supporting the treaties in October, but the Senate added amendments Taft could not accept, killing them.

Arbitration revealed a dispute among American progressives. One faction, led by Taft looked to it as the best alternative to warfare. Taft was a constitutional lawyer, understanding the legal issues. Taft's base was the conservative business community that supported peace movements before 1914. However, he failed to mobilize them. The businessmen believed economic rivalries were the cause of war, and that trade led to an interdependent world that would make war expensive and useless. However, an opposing faction, led by Roosevelt, ridiculed arbitration as foolhardy idealism, and insisted on the realism of war as the only solution to serious international disputes. Roosevelt worked with close friend Senator Henry Cabot Lodge to impose those amendments that ruined the treaties. Roosevelt was acting to sabotage Taft's campaign promises. At a deeper level, Roosevelt truly believed arbitration was a naïve solution and great issues had to be decided by war. The Rooseveltian approach incorporated a near-mystical faith of the ennobling nature of war. It endorsed jingoistic nationalism as opposed to the businessmen's calculation of profit and national interest.

=== Africa and Europe (1909–1910) ===
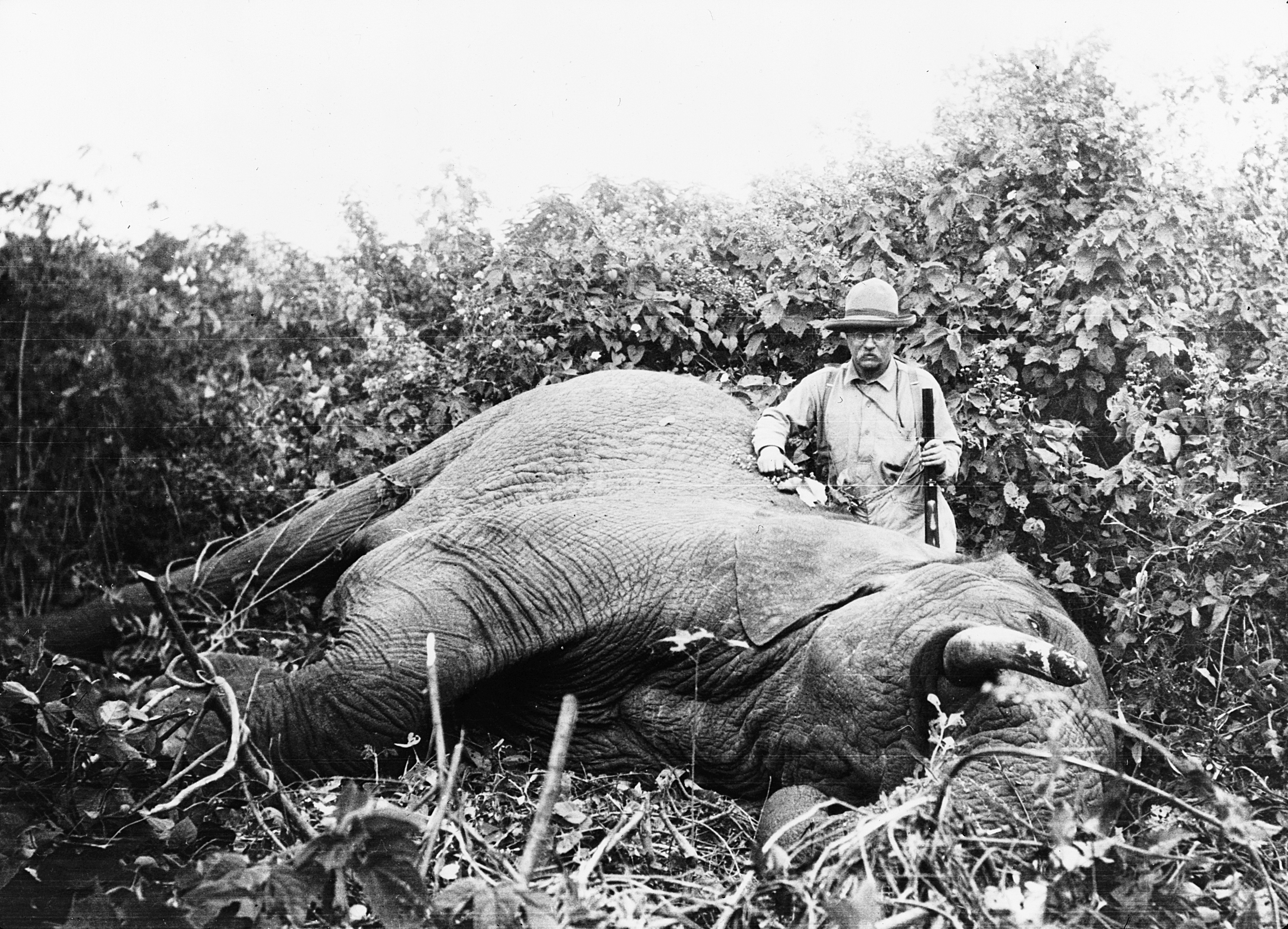
Roosevelt standing next to the elephant he shot on a safari in Africa

In March 1909, the ex-president left for the Smithsonian-Roosevelt African Expedition. Roosevelt's party landed in Mombasa in East Africa and traveled to the Belgian Congo before following the Nile River to Khartoum in modern Sudan. Well-financed by Andrew Carnegie and by his own writings, Roosevelt's party hunted for specimens for the Smithsonian Institution and American Museum of Natural History. The group, led by hunter-tracker R.J. Cunninghame, included scientists from the Smithsonian, and was joined by Frederick Selous, famous big game hunter and explorer. Participants included Kermit Roosevelt, Edgar Alexander Mearns, Edmund Heller, and John Alden Loring. The team killed or trapped 11,400 animals, from insects and moles to hippopotamuses and elephants. The 1,000 large animals included 512 big game animals, including six rare white rhinos. Tons of salted carcasses and skins were shipped to Washington; it took years to mount them all. Regarding the large number taken, Roosevelt said, "I can be condemned only if the existence of the National Museum, the American Museum of Natural History, and all similar zoological institutions are to be condemned". He wrote a detailed account of the trip in African Game Trails.

After his safari, Roosevelt traveled north to embark on a tour of Europe. Stopping first in Egypt, he commented favorably on British rule, stating Egypt was not yet ready for independence. He refused a meeting with the Pope due to a dispute over a group of Methodists active in Rome. He met with Emperor Franz Joseph of Austria-Hungary, Kaiser Wilhelm II of Germany, King George V of Great Britain, and other leaders. In Oslo, Roosevelt delivered a speech calling for limitations on naval armaments, a strengthening of the Permanent Court of Arbitration, and the creation of a "League of Peace" among the world powers. He delivered the Romanes Lecture at Oxford, where he denounced those who sought parallels between the evolution of animal life and the development of society. Though Roosevelt attempted to avoid domestic politics, he quietly met with Gifford Pinchot, who related his disappointment with the Taft Administration. Pinchot had been forced to resign as head of the forest service after clashing with Taft's Interior Secretary, Richard Ballinger. Roosevelt returned to the U.S. in June 1910. Four months later, Roosevelt became the first U.S. president to fly in a plane, staying aloft for 4 minutes in a Wright brothers-designed craft.

Roosevelt relied on Andrew Carnegie for financing his expedition. In return, Carnegie asked the ex-president to mediate the growing conflict between the cousins who ruled Britain and Germany. Roosevelt started to, but the scheme collapsed when King Edward VII suddenly died. David Nasaw argues Roosevelt systematically deceived and manipulated Carnegie and held the elderly man in contempt.

=== South American expedition (1913–1914) ===
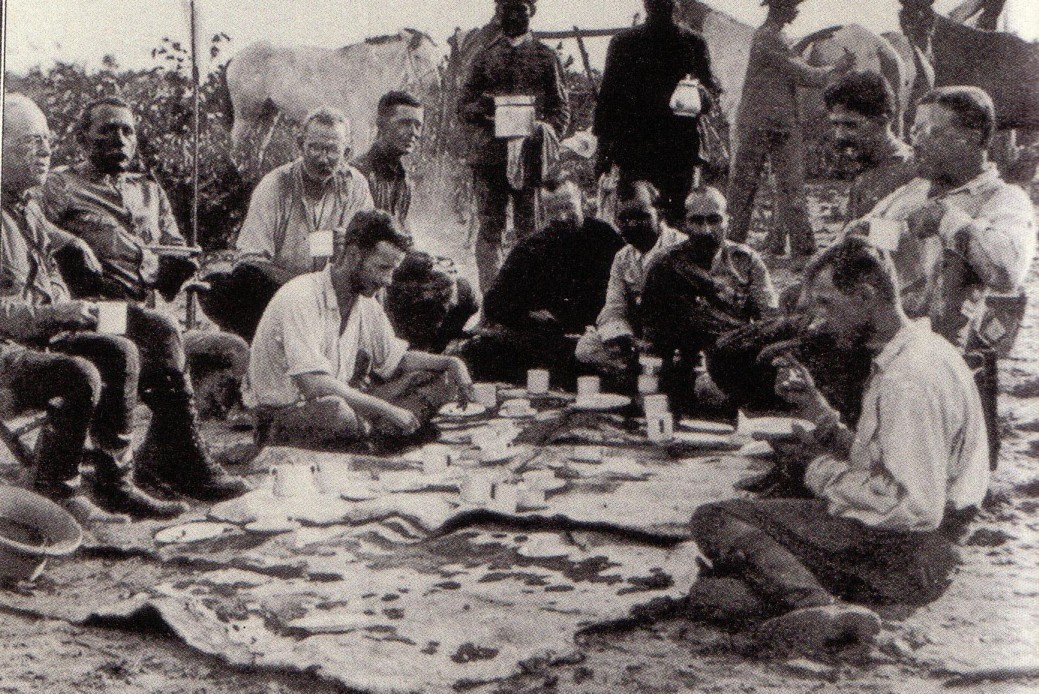
Left to right (seated): Father John Augustine Zahm, Cândido Rondon, Kermit Roosevelt, Cherrie, Miller, four Brazilians, Roosevelt, Fiala. Only Roosevelt, Kermit, Cherrie, Rondon, and the Brazilians traveled down the River of Doubt.

In 1907 a friend of Roosevelt's, John Augustine Zahm, invited Roosevelt to help plan a research expedition to South America. To finance it, Roosevelt obtained support from the American Museum of Natural History in return for promising to bring back new animal specimens. Roosevelt's popular book, Through the Brazilian Wilderness describes his expedition into the Brazilian jungle in 1913 as a member of the Roosevelt–Rondon Scientific Expedition, co-named after its leader, Brazilian Cândido Rondon.

Once in South America, a more ambitious goal was added: to find the headwaters of the river Duvida and trace it north to the Madeira and thence to the Amazon River. Duvida was later renamed Roosevelt River. Roosevelt's crew consisted of his son Kermit, Colonel Rondon, naturalist George Kruck Cherrie, Brazilian Lieutenant João Lira, team physician José Antonio Cajazeira, and 16 skilled paddlers and porters. The initial expedition started tenuously on December 9, 1913, at the height of rainy season. The trip down Duvida started on February 27, 1914.

Roosevelt suffered a minor leg wound after he jumped in to try to prevent canoes from smashing against the rocks. The flesh wound he received, however, soon gave him tropical fever that resembled the malaria he had contracted while in Cuba. The infection weakened Roosevelt so greatly that six weeks in, he had to be attended to constantly by the expedition's physician and Kermit. By then, he could not walk because of the infection and an infirmity in the other leg, due to a traffic accident a decade earlier. Roosevelt had chest pains and a fever that soared to 103 °F (39 °C) and made him delirious. Regarding his condition as a threat to others' survival, Roosevelt insisted he be left behind to allow the poorly provisioned expedition to proceed, preparing to commit suicide with morphine. Only an appeal by his son persuaded him to continue.

Despite Roosevelt's continued decline and loss of 50 pounds (23 kg), Rondon reduced the pace for map-making, which required regular stops to fix their position by sun-based survey. Upon Roosevelt's return to New York, friends and family were startled by his physical appearance and fatigue. Roosevelt wrote, perhaps prophetically, to a friend that it had cut his life short by ten years. For the rest of his few remaining years, he would be plagued by flare-ups of malaria and leg inflammations so severe as to require surgery. Before Roosevelt had even completed his sea voyage home, critics raised doubts over his claims of exploring and navigating a completely uncharted river over 625 miles (1,006 km) long. When he had recovered sufficiently, he addressed a standing-room-only convention organized in Washington, by the National Geographic Society and satisfactorily defended his claims.

=== Writer ===
Address to the Boys Progressive League
A speech by Roosevelt as a former President

Roosevelt was a prolific author, writing with passion on subjects ranging from foreign policy to the importance of the national park system. Roosevelt was also an avid reader of poetry. Poet Robert Frost said that Roosevelt "was our kind. He quoted poetry to me. He knew poetry."

As an editor of The Outlook, Roosevelt had weekly access to a large, educated national audience. In all, Roosevelt wrote about 18 books (each in several editions), including his autobiography, The Rough Riders, History of the Naval War of 1812, and others on subjects such as ranching, explorations, and wildlife. His most ambitious book was the four-volume narrative The Winning of the West, focused on the American frontier in the 18th and early 19th centuries. Roosevelt said that the American character—indeed a new "American race"—had emerged from the heroic wilderness hunters and Indian fighters, acting on the frontier with little government help.

In 1905, Roosevelt became embroiled in a widely publicized literary debate known as the nature fakers controversy. A few years earlier, naturalist John Burroughs had published an article entitled "Real and Sham Natural History" in the Atlantic Monthly, attacking popular writers of the day such as Ernest Thompson Seton, Charles G. D. Roberts, and William J. Long for their fantastical representations of wildlife. Roosevelt agreed with Burroughs's criticisms and published several essays denouncing the booming genre of "naturalistic" animal stories as "yellow journalism of the woods". It was the President himself who popularized the negative term "nature faker" to describe writers who depicted their animal characters with excessive anthropomorphism.

=== Final years ===
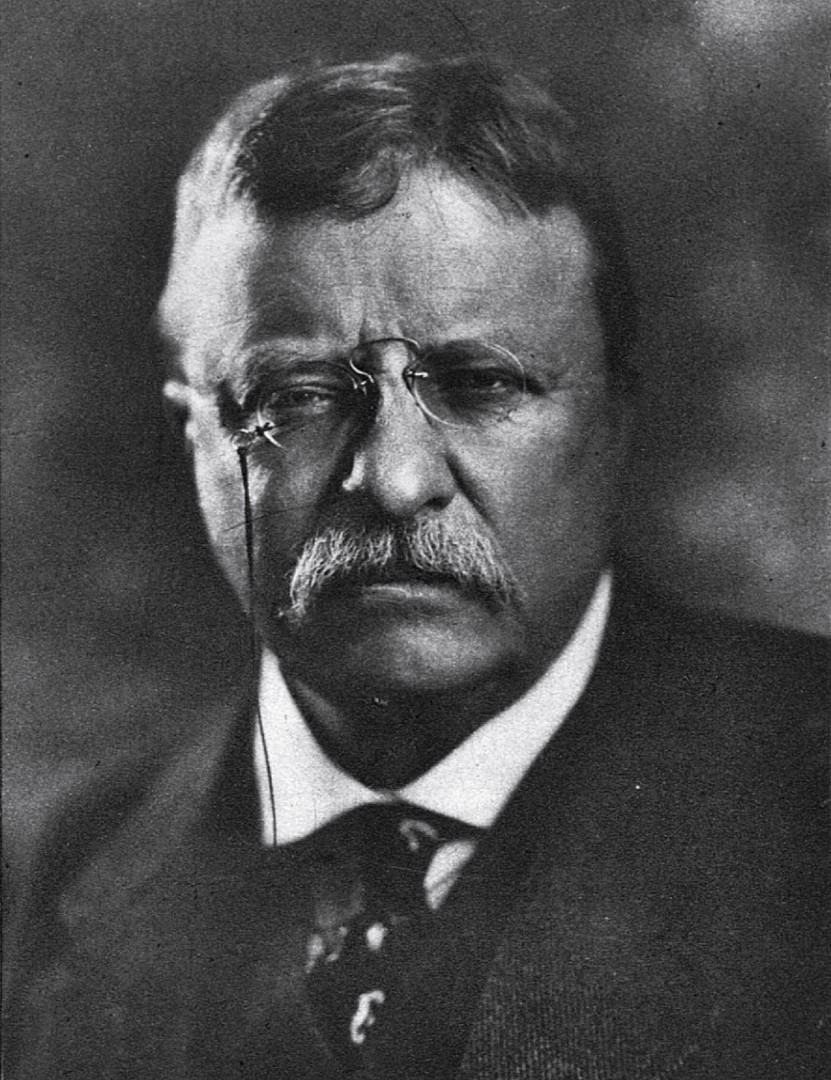
Roosevelt c. 1914–1918

Roosevelt returned to the U.S. in May 1914. Though he was outraged by the Wilson Administration's conclusion of a treaty that expressed "sincere regret" for the way in which the U.S. had acquired the Panama Canal Zone, he was impressed by many reforms passed. Roosevelt made campaign appearances for the Progressives, but the 1914 elections were a disaster for the fledgling third party. Roosevelt began to envision another campaign for president, this time with himself at the head of the Republican Party, but conservative party leaders remained opposed to Roosevelt. In hopes of engineering a joint nomination, the Progressives scheduled the 1916 Progressive National Convention at the same time as the 1916 Republican National Convention. When the Republicans nominated Charles Evans Hughes, Roosevelt declined the Progressive nomination and urged his Progressive followers to support the Republican candidate. Though Roosevelt had long disliked Hughes, he disliked Wilson even more, and campaigned energetically for the Republican nominee. However, Wilson won the 1916 election by a narrow margin. The Progressives disappeared as a party, and Roosevelt and many of his followers rejoined the Republican Party.

==== World War I ====
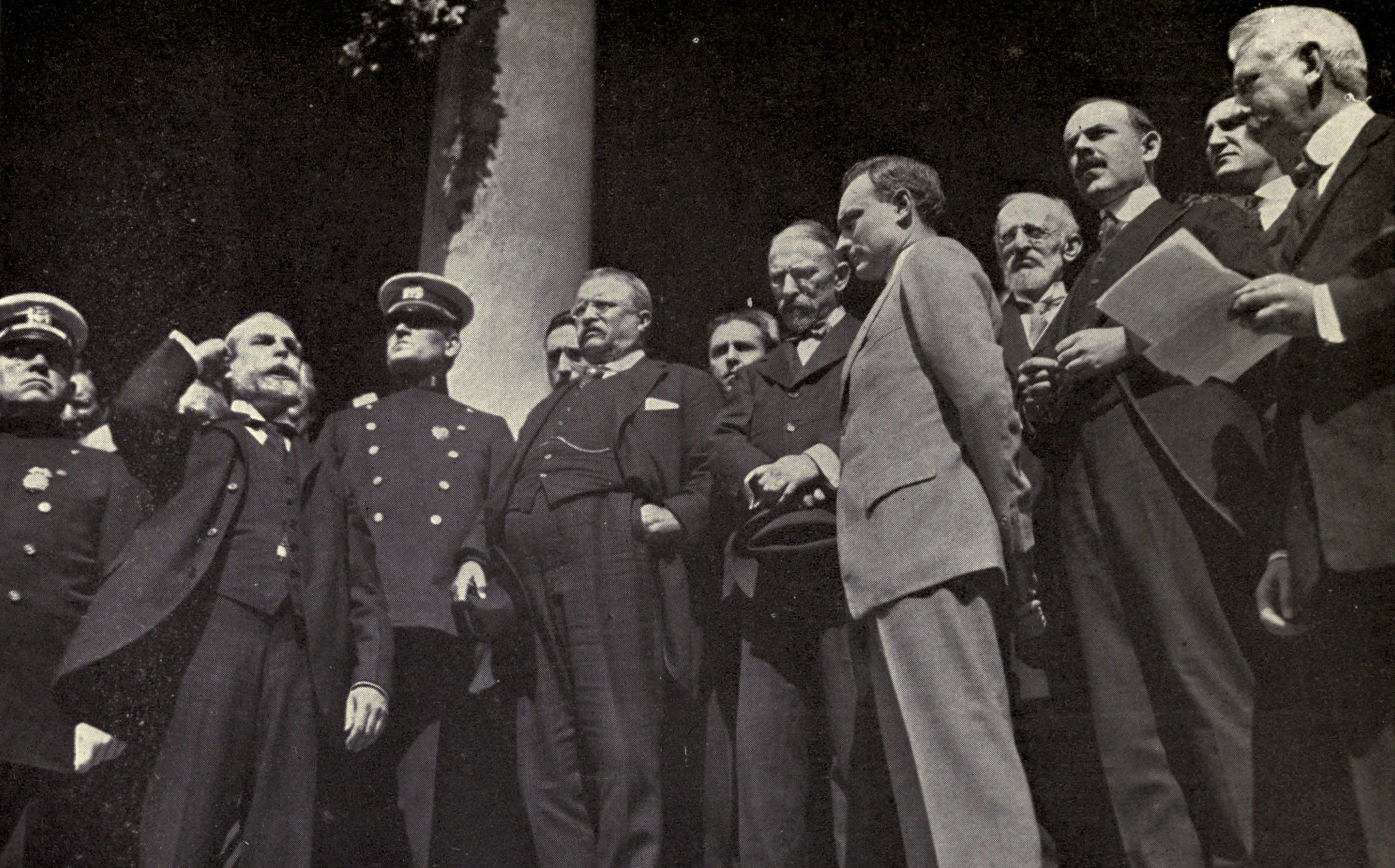
Charles Evans Hughes, Roosevelt, Henry Morgenthau, Oscar Straus, and other distinguished citizens pledge their support to Mayor John Purroy Mitchel on the steps of New York City Hall, October 1, 1917

When the First World War began in 1914, Roosevelt strongly supported the Allies and demanded a harsher policy against Germany, especially regarding submarine warfare. Roosevelt angrily denounced the foreign policy of Wilson, calling it a failure regarding the atrocities in Belgium and the violations of American rights. In 1916, while campaigning for Hughes, Roosevelt repeatedly denounced Irish Americans and German Americans whom he described as unpatriotic; he insisted that one had to be 100% American, not a "hyphenated American" who juggled multiple loyalties. In March 1917, Congress gave Roosevelt the authority to raise a maximum of four divisions similar to the Rough Riders. However, President Wilson announced to the press that he would not send Roosevelt and his volunteers to France, but instead an American Expeditionary Force under the command of General John J. Pershing. Roosevelt never forgave Wilson, and published The Foes of Our Own Household, an indictment of the sitting president. Roosevelt's youngest son, Quentin, a pilot with the American forces in France, was killed when shot down behind German lines on July 14, 1918, aged 20. Roosevelt never recovered from his loss.

==== League of Nations ====
Roosevelt was an early supporter of the modern view that there needs to be a global order. In his Nobel prize address of 1910, he said, "it would be a master stroke if those great Powers honestly bent on peace would form a League of Peace, not only to keep the peace among themselves, but to prevent, by force if necessary, its being broken by others." It would have executive power such as the Hague Conventions of 1899 and 1907 lacked. He called for American participation.

When World War I broke out, Roosevelt proposed "a World League for the Peace of Righteousness", in September 1914, which would preserve sovereignty but limit armaments and require arbitration. He added it should be "solemnly covenanted that if any nations refused to abide by the decisions of such a court, then others draw the sword in behalf of peace and justice." In 1915 he outlined this plan more specifically, urging nations guarantee their entire military force, if necessary, against any nation that refused to carry out arbitration decrees or violated rights of other nations. Though Roosevelt had some concerns about the impact on United States sovereignty, he insisted that such a league would only work if the United States participated as one of the "joint guarantors". Roosevelt referred to this plan in a 1918 speech as "the most feasible for...a league of nations". By this time Wilson was strongly hostile to Roosevelt and Lodge and developed his own plans for a different League of Nations. It became reality along Wilson's lines at the Paris Peace Conference in 1919. Roosevelt denounced Wilson's approach but died before it was adopted at Paris. However, Lodge was willing to accept it with serious reservations. In the end, on March 19, 1920, Wilson had Democratic Senators vote against the League with the Lodge Reservations and the United States never joined the League of Nations.

==== Final political activities ====
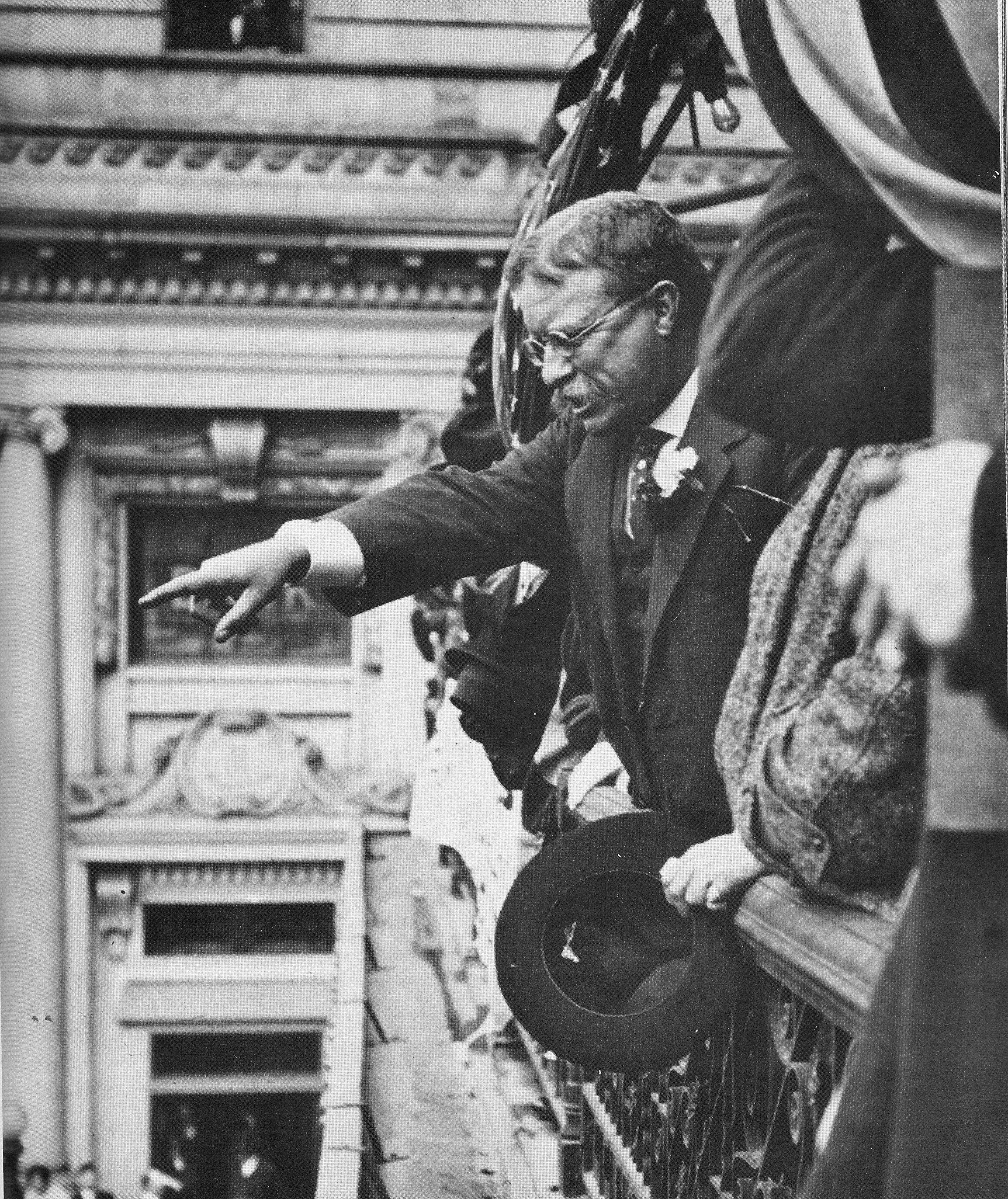
Former President Theodore Roosevelt in Allentown, Pennsylvania in 1914

Roosevelt's attacks on Wilson helped the Republicans win control of Congress in the midterm elections of 1918. He declined a request from New York Republicans to run for another gubernatorial term, but attacked Wilson's Fourteen Points, calling instead for the unconditional surrender of Germany. Though his health was uncertain, he was seen as a leading contender for the 1920 Republican nomination, but insisted that, "If they take me, they'll have to take me without a single modification of the things that I have always stood for!" He wrote to William Allen White, "I wish to do everything in my power to make the Republican Party the Party of sane, constructive radicalism, just as it was under Lincoln." Accordingly, he told the 1918 state convention of the Maine Republican Party that he stood for old-age pensions, insurance for sickness and unemployment, construction of public housing for low-income families, the reduction of working hours, aid to farmers, and more regulation of large corporations.

While his political profile remained high, Roosevelt's physical condition deteriorated throughout 1918 due to the long-term effects of jungle diseases. He was hospitalized for seven weeks and never fully recovered.

== Death ==
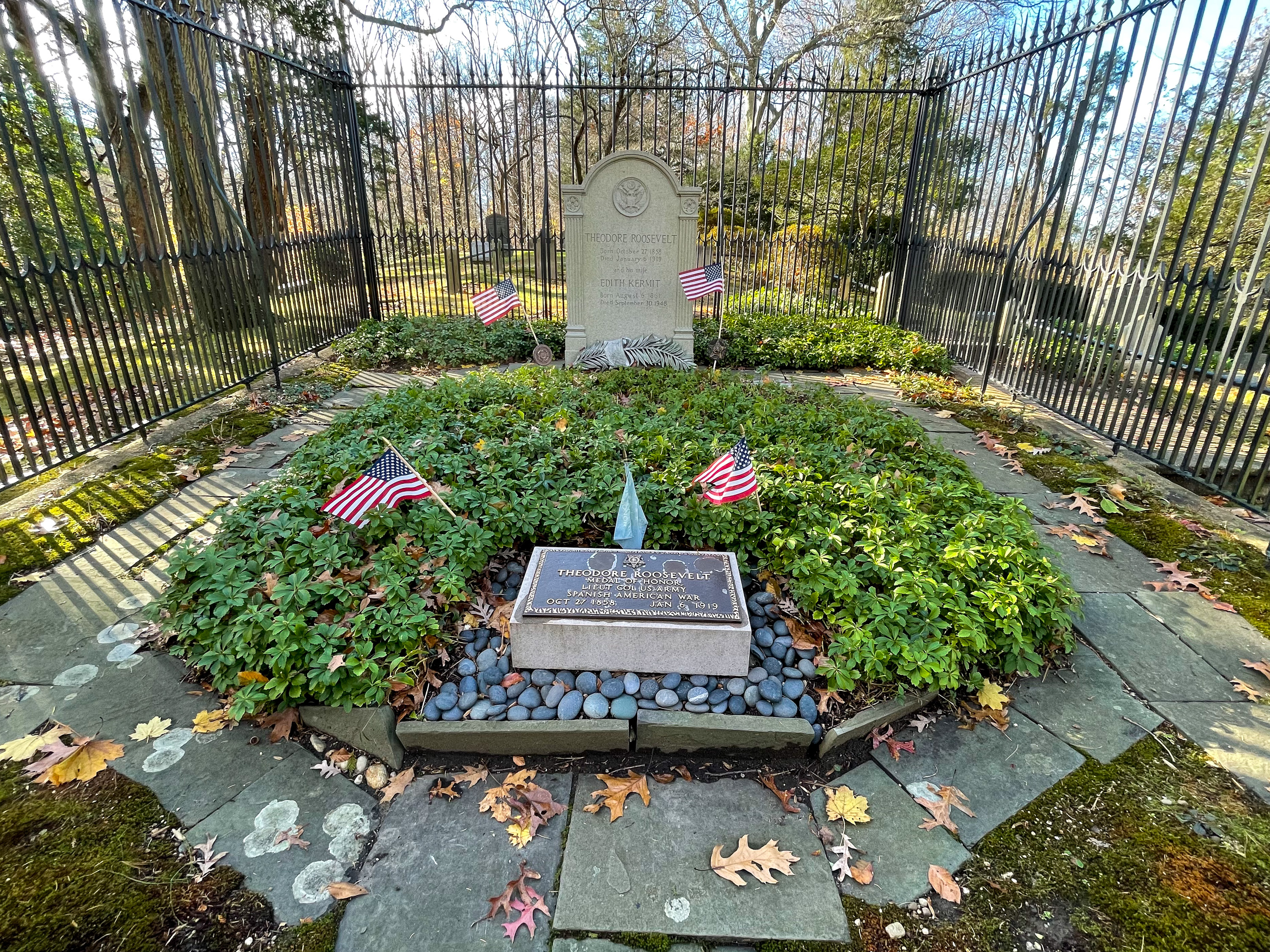
Theodore and Edith Roosevelt's grave at Youngs Memorial Cemetery

On the night of January 5, 1919, Roosevelt suffered breathing problems. After receiving treatment from his physician, George W. Faller, he felt better and went to bed. Roosevelt's last words were either "Please put out that light, James" or "James, will you please put out the light.", said to his family servant James E. Amos. Between 4:00 and 4:15 the next morning, Roosevelt died at the age of 60 in his sleep at Sagamore Hill of a pulmonary embolism.

Upon receiving word of his death, his son Archibald telegraphed his siblings: "The old lion is dead." Woodrow Wilson's vice president, Thomas R. Marshall, said that "Death had to take Roosevelt sleeping, for if he had been awake, there would have been a fight." Following a private farewell service in the North Room at Sagamore Hill, a simple funeral was held at Christ Episcopal Church in Oyster Bay on January 8. Vice President Marshall, former New York Governor Charles Evans Hughes, Senators Warren G. Harding and Henry Cabot Lodge, and former President William Howard Taft were among the mourners. The procession route to Youngs Memorial Cemetery was lined with spectators and a squad of mounted policemen who had ridden from New York City. Roosevelt was buried on a hillside overlooking Oyster Bay.

== Legacy ==
Historians credit Roosevelt for changing the nation's political system by placing the "bully pulpit" of the presidency at center stage and emphasizing character as much as issues. His accomplishments include trust busting and conservationism. He is a hero to liberals and progressives for his early proposals that foreshadowed the 21st century welfare state, including federal taxation, labor reforms, and more direct democracy, and his domestic programs such as the New Nationalism have been considered foundational to the ideology of 21st century liberalism in the United States. Conservationists admire Roosevelt for prioritizing the environment and selflessness towards future generations. Nationalists and some conservatives respect his commitment to law and order, civic duty, and military values. Dalton stated in 2002 that "Today he is heralded as the architect of the modern presidency, as a world leader who boldly reshaped the office to meet the needs of the new century."

Socialists and some progressives criticize his interventionist and imperialist approach, while libertarians reject his vision of the welfare state. Historians typically rank Roosevelt among the top five presidents.

=== Persona and masculinity ===
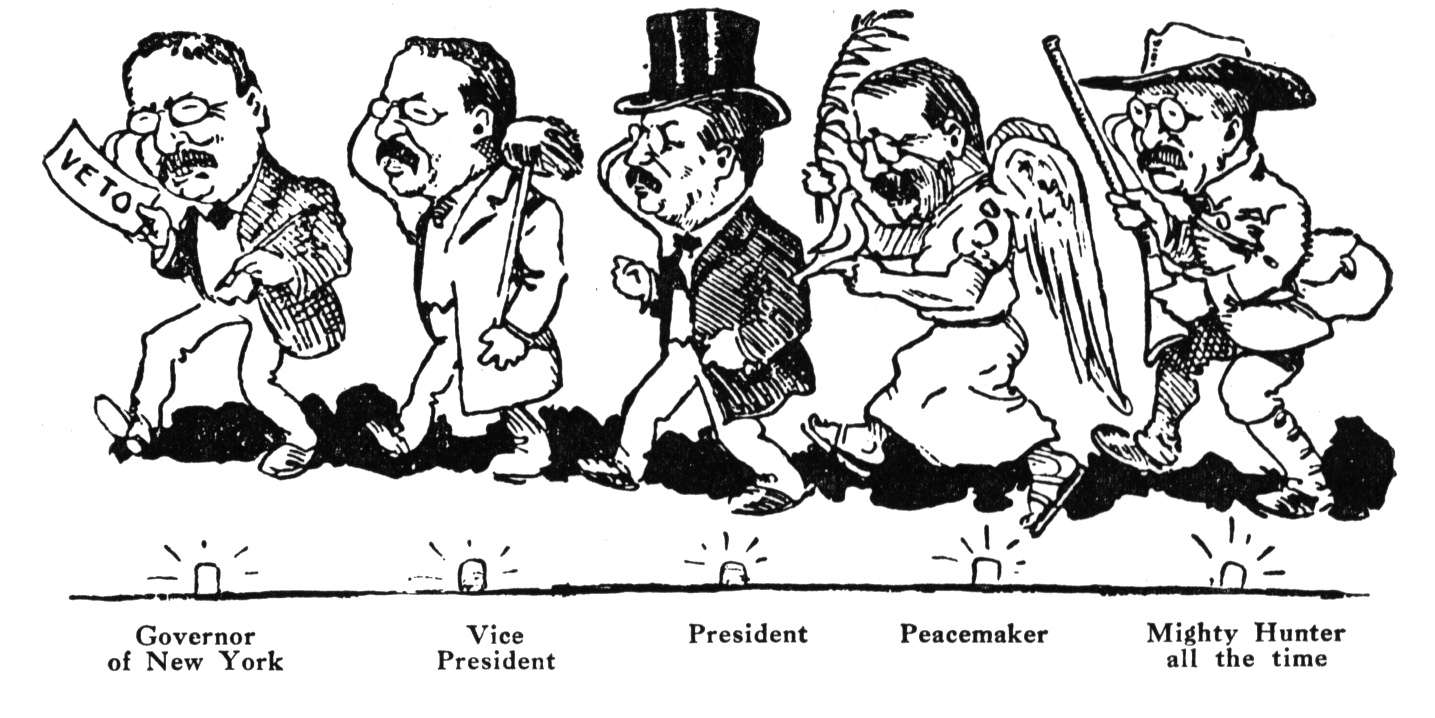
A 1910 cartoon depicting Roosevelt's many roles from 1899 to 1910

Dalton says Roosevelt is remembered as "one of the most picturesque personalities who has ever enlivened the landscape". His friend, historian Henry Adams, proclaimed: "Roosevelt, more than any other man... showed the singular primitive quality that belongs to ultimate matter—the quality that medieval theology assigned to God—he was pure act". Cooper compared him with Woodrow Wilson, highlighting their roles as warrior and priest. Dalton stressed Roosevelt's strenuous life. Brands calls Roosevelt "the last romantic", viewing his romantic notion of life as emerging from his belief in physical bravery as the highest virtue. Henry F. Pringle, who won the Pulitzer Prize for Theodore Roosevelt (1931), stated the "Roosevelt of later years was the most adolescent of men."

Roosevelt as the exemplar of American masculinity has become a major theme. He often warned that men were becoming too complacent, failing in their duties to propagate the race and exhibit masculine vigor. Historian Serge Ricard noted that Roosevelt's advocacy of the "Strenuous Life" made him an ideal subject for psycho-historical analysis of aggressive manhood in his era. He promoted competitive sports for physically strengthening American men and supported organizations like the Boy Scouts, to mold and strengthen the character of American boys. Brands shows that heroic displays of bravery were central to Roosevelt's image:

What makes the hero a hero is the romantic notion that he stands above the tawdry give and take of everyday politics, occupying an ethereal realm where partisanship gives way to patriotism, and division to unity, and where the nation regains its lost innocence...

In 1902, Théobald Chartran was commissioned to paint Roosevelt's presidential portrait. Roosevelt hid it in a closet before having it destroyed because it made him look like a "meek kitten". Roosevelt instead chose John Singer Sargent to paint his portrait.

=== Memorials and cultural depictions ===
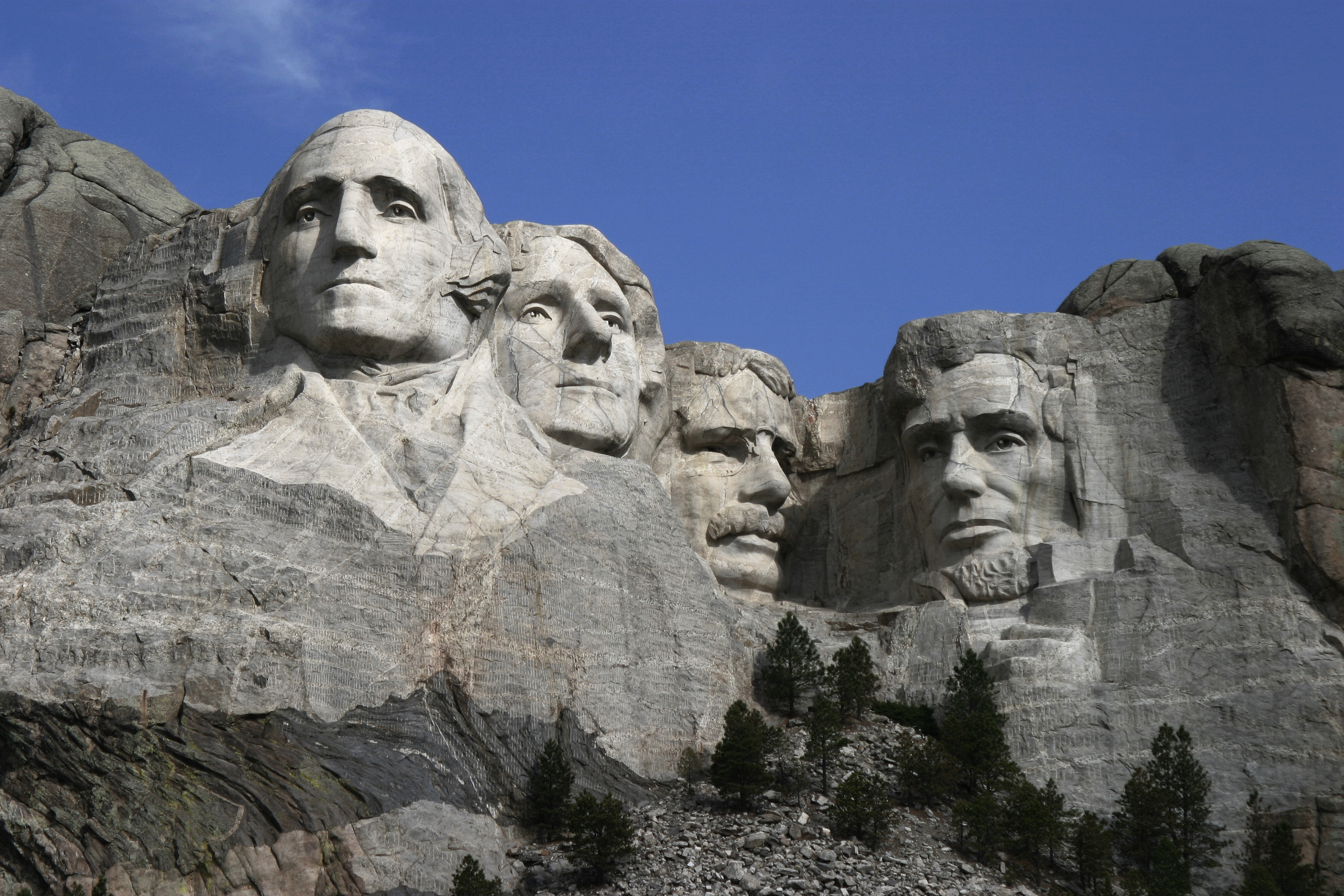
Roosevelt, second from right, on Mount Rushmore

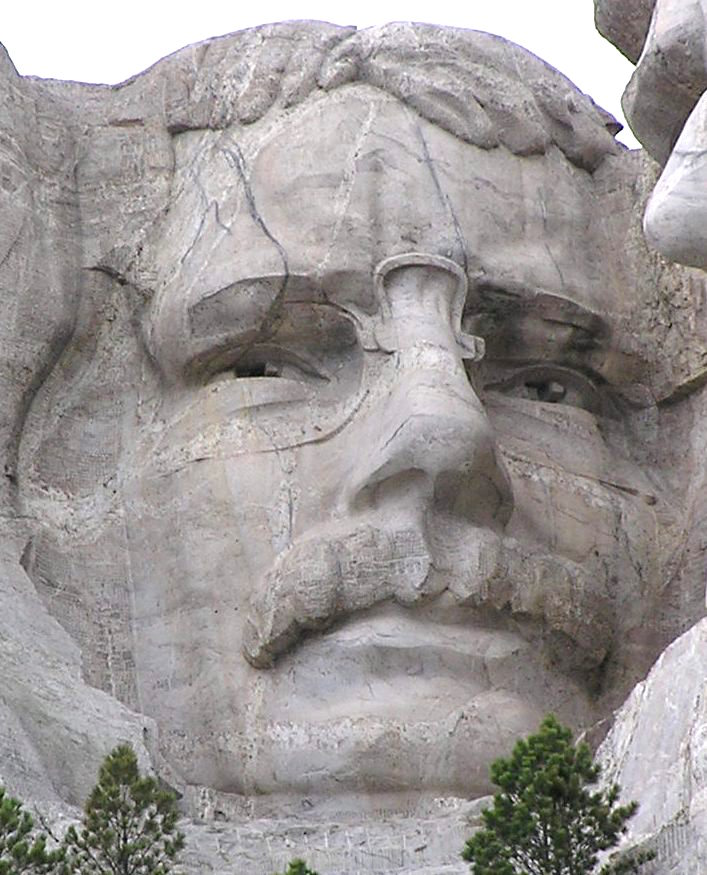
A close up of Roosevelt's face on Mount Rushmore

Roosevelt was included with Presidents George Washington, Thomas Jefferson, and Abraham Lincoln at the Mount Rushmore Memorial, designed in 1927.

Roosevelt's "Speak Softly and Carry a Big Stick" ideology is still quoted by politicians and columnists—not only in English, but in many translations. Another popular legacy is the teddy bear—named after him following an incident on a hunting trip in Mississippi in 1902.

For his gallantry at San Juan Hill, Roosevelt's commanders recommended him for the Medal of Honor. However, the recommendation lacked any eyewitnesses, and the effort was tainted by Roosevelt's lobbying of the War Department. In the 1990s, Roosevelt's supporters again recommended the award, which was denied by the Secretary of the Army on the basis the decorations board determined "Roosevelt's bravery in battle did not rise to the level that would justify the Medal of Honor and, indeed, it did not rise to the level of men who fought in that engagement." Nevertheless, politicians apparently convinced the secretary to reconsider and reverse himself, leading to the charge it was a "politically motivated award". In 2001, President Bill Clinton awarded Theodore Roosevelt the Medal of Honor for his charge. He is the only president to have received it.

The United States Navy named two ships for Roosevelt: the USS Theodore Roosevelt (SSBN-600), a submarine in commission from 1961 to 1982, and the USS Theodore Roosevelt (CVN-71), an aircraft carrier on active duty in the Atlantic Fleet since 1986. Roosevelt has appeared on five U.S. Postage stamps, the first being issued in 1922. In 1956, the United States Postal Service released a 6¢ Liberty Issue postage stamp honoring Roosevelt. A 32¢ stamp was issued in 1998, as part of the Celebrate the Century series. Theodore Roosevelt National Park in North Dakota is named after him. The America the Beautiful Quarters series features Roosevelt riding a horse on the national park's quarter. Asteroid 188693 Roosevelt, discovered in 2005, was named after him. The official naming citation was published by the Minor Planet Center on November 8, 2019 (M.P.C. 118221). Robert Peary named the Roosevelt Range and Roosevelt Land after him.

Roosevelt has also been portrayed in films and television series such as Brighty of the Grand Canyon, The Wind and the Lion, Rough Riders, My Friend Flicka, and Law of the Plainsman. Robin Williams portrayed Roosevelt in the form of a wax mannequin that comes to life in Night at the Museum and its sequels. Roosevelt is the leader of the American civilization in the video game Civilization VI. Beginning in 1965, Al Sheehan produced an annual musical spectacular on the history of North Dakota performed at the Medora Musical, which included a portrayal of Roosevelt in the Badlands.

For 80 years, an equestrian statue of Roosevelt, sitting above a Native American and an African American, stood in front of New York's American Museum of Natural History. In 2022, after years of lobbying by activists, the statue was removed. Museum president Ellen V. Futter said the decision did not reflect a judgment about Roosevelt but the sculpture's "hierarchical composition".

=== Audiovisual media ===
Roosevelt was one of the first presidents whose voice was recorded for posterity. Several of his recorded speeches survive. A 1912 voice recording of The Right of the People to Rule, which preserves Roosevelt's lower timbre ranges particularly well for its time, is available from the Michigan State University libraries. The audio clip sponsored by the Authentic History Center includes his defense of the Progressive Party in 1912, wherein he proclaims it the "party of the people" – in contrast with the other major parties.

Parade for the school children down Van Ness Avenue in San Francisco

Collection of film clips of Roosevelt

== Personal life ==
=== First marriage and widowerhood ===
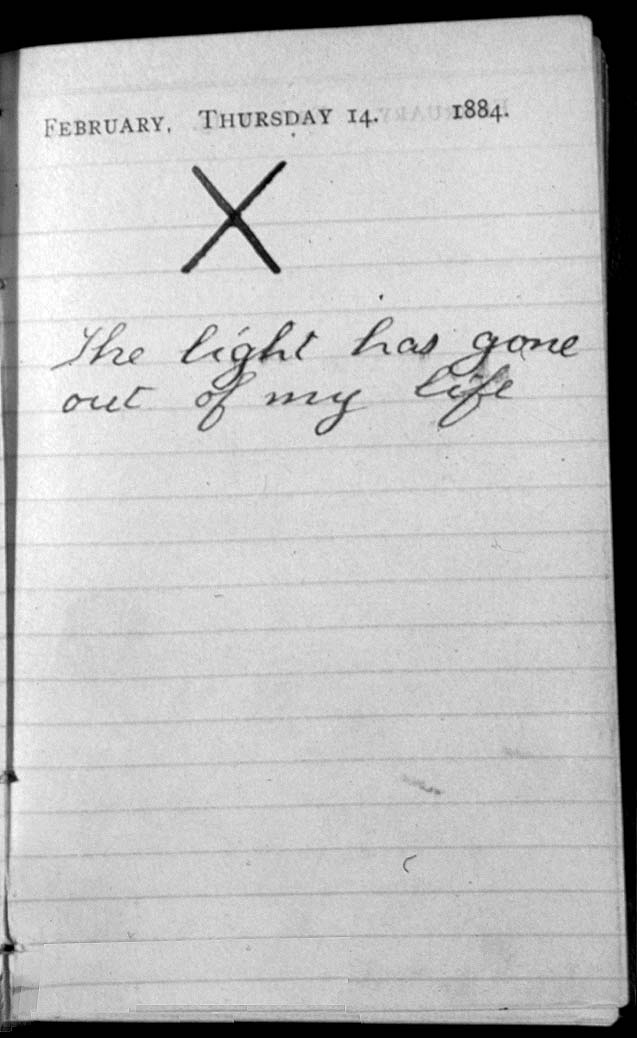
Roosevelt's diary entry "The light has gone out of my life"

In 1880, Roosevelt married socialite Alice Hathaway Lee. Their daughter, Alice Lee Roosevelt, was born on February 12, 1884. Two days later, the new mother died of undiagnosed kidney failure, on the same day as Roosevelt's mother Martha died of typhoid fever. In his diary, Roosevelt wrote a large "X" on the page and then, "The light has gone out of my life." Distraught, Roosevelt left baby Alice in the care of his sister Bamie while he grieved; he assumed custody of Alice when she was three. For the rest of his life, he rarely spoke about his wife Alice and did not write about her in his autobiography.

After the deaths of his wife and mother, Roosevelt focused on his work, specifically by re-energizing a legislative investigation into corruption of the New York City government, which arose from a bill proposing power be centralized in the mayor's office.

=== Second marriage and widowerhood ===
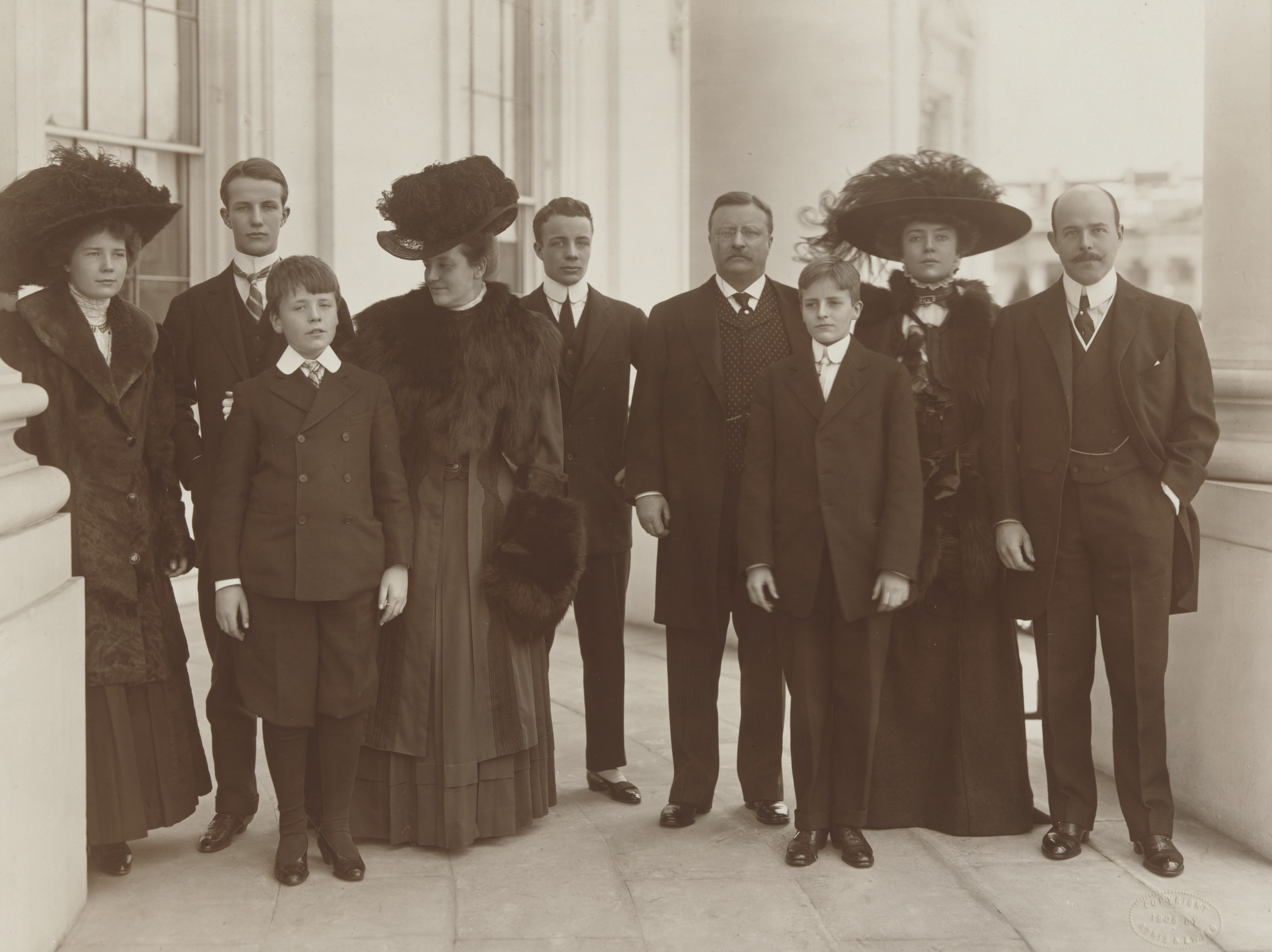
Roosevelt and members of his family. Left to right: Ethel, Kermit, Quentin, Edith, Theodore III (Ted), Theodore, Archibald, Alice, and Nicholas Longworth

On December 2, 1886, Roosevelt married his childhood friend, Edith Kermit Carow, at St George's, Hanover Square, in London, England. Roosevelt felt deeply troubled that his second marriage was soon after the death of his first wife and he faced resistance from his sisters. The couple had five children: Theodore "Ted" III in 1887, Kermit in 1889, Ethel in 1891, Archibald in 1894, and Quentin in 1897. They also raised Roosevelt's daughter from his first marriage, Alice, who often clashed with her stepmother.

=== Character and beliefs ===
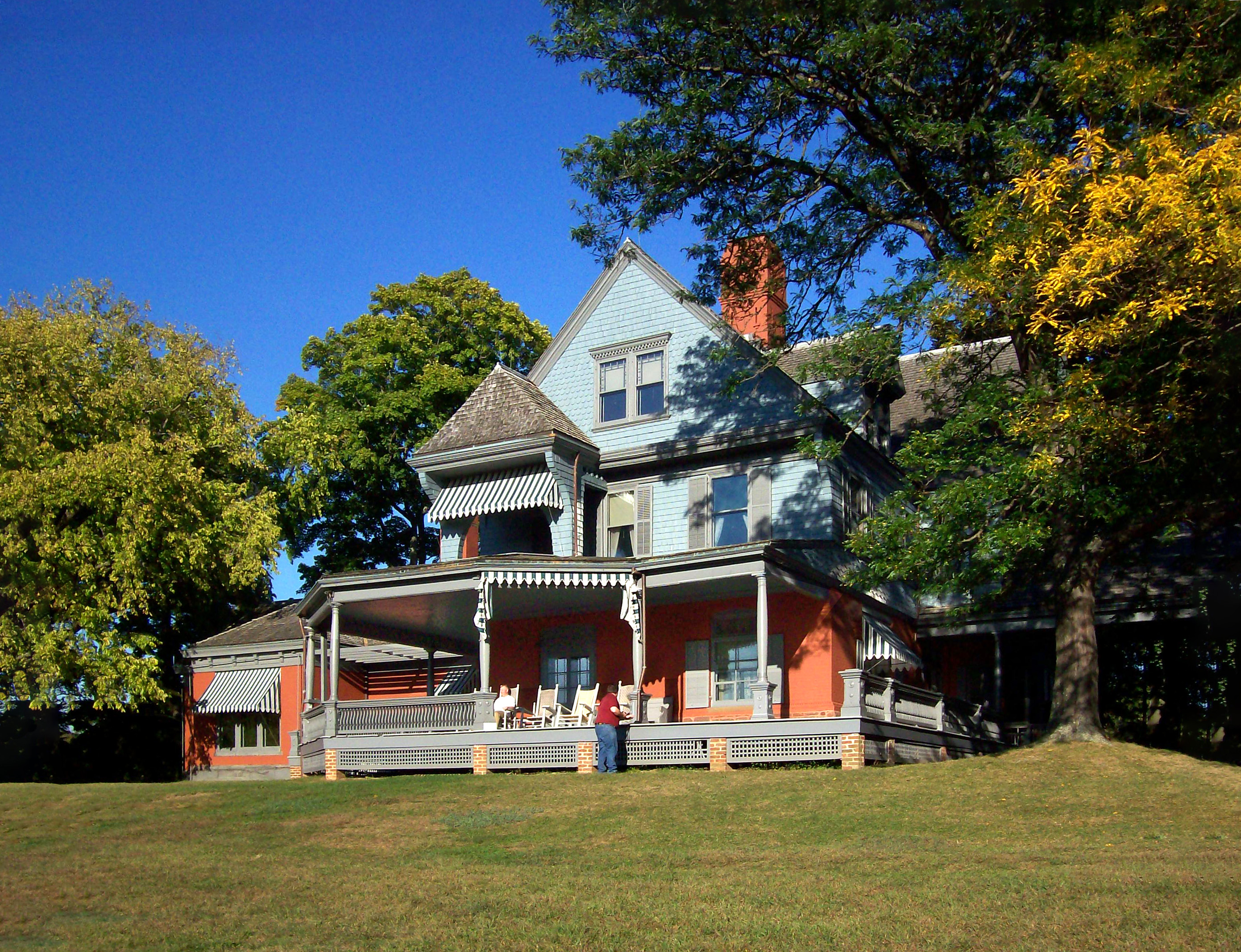
Sagamore Hill, Roosevelt's estate on Long Island

British scholar Marcus Cunliffe evaluates the liberal argument that Roosevelt was an opportunist, exhibitionist, and imperialist. Cunliffe praises Roosevelt's versatility, his respect for law, and his sincerity. He argues that Roosevelt's foreign policy was better than his detractors allege. Cunliffe calls him "a big man in several respects".

Roosevelt was a Freemason and a member of the Sons of the American Revolution. He was also a member of The Explorers Club. Roosevelt had a lifelong interest in pursuing what he called, in an 1899 speech, "The Strenuous Life". To this end, he exercised regularly and took up boxing, tennis, hiking, rowing, polo, and horseback riding. As governor of New York, he boxed with sparring partners several times each week, a practice he regularly continued as president until being hit so hard in the face he became blind in his left eye (a fact not made public until many years later). Roosevelt began to believe in the utility of jiu-jitsu training after training with Yoshitsugu Yamashita. Concerned that the U.S. would lose its military supremacy to rising powers like Japan, Roosevelt began to advocate for jiu-jitsu training for American soldiers. Roosevelt was an enthusiastic singlestick player and, according to Harper's Weekly, showed up at a White House reception with his arm bandaged after a bout with General Leonard Wood in 1905.

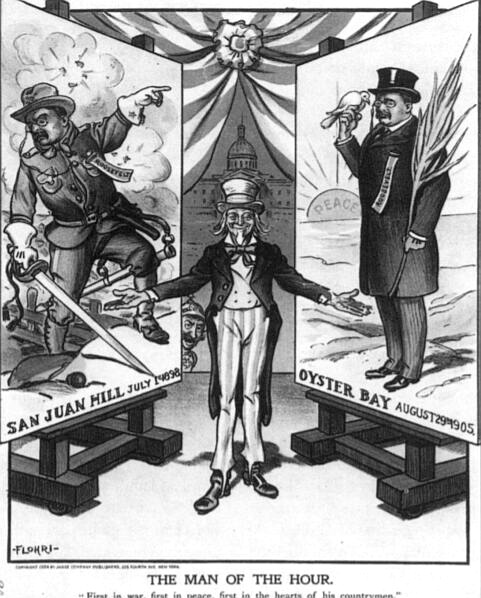
"The Man of the Hour", depicting Roosevelt as warrior in 1898 and peacemaker in 1905, settling war between Russia and Japan

Historians have often emphasized Roosevelt's warrior persona. Richard D. White Jr states, "Roosevelt's warrior spirit framed his views of national politics, [and] international relations." He took aggressive positions regarding war with Spain in 1898, Colombia in 1903, and especially with Germany, from 1915 to 1917. As a demonstration of American naval might, he sent the Great White Fleet around the world in 1907–1909. He boasted in his autobiography:

When I left the Presidency I finished seven and a half years of administration, during which not one shot had been fired against a foreign foe. We were at absolute peace, and there was no nation in the world with whom a war cloud threatened, no nation in the world whom we had wronged, or from whom we had anything to fear. The cruise of the battle fleet was not the least of the causes which ensured so peaceful an outlook.

Historian Howard K. Beale has argued:

He and his associates came close to seeking war for its own sake. Ignorant of modern war, Roosevelt romanticized war. ... Like many young men tamed by civilization into law-abiding but adventurous living, he needed an outlet for the pent-up primordial man in him and found it in fighting and killing, vicariously or directly, in hunting or in war. Indeed he had a fairly good time in war when war came. ... There was something dull and effeminate about peace. ... He gloried in war, was thrilled by military history, and placed warlike qualities high in his scale of values. Without consciously desiring it, he thought a little war now and then stimulated admirable qualities in men. Certainly preparedness for war did.

Roosevelt often praised moral behavior, while never making a spiritual confession of his own faith. After the 1884 death of his wife, he almost never mentioned Jesus in public or private. His rejection of dogma and spirituality, says biographer William Harbaugh, led to a broad tolerance. Roosevelt publicly encouraged church attendance and was a conscientious churchgoer himself, a lifelong adherent of the Dutch Reformed church. When gas rationing was introduced during the First World War, he walked the three miles from his home to the local church and back, even after a serious operation. According to Christian Reisner, "Religion was as natural to Mr. Roosevelt as breathing", and when the travel library for Roosevelt's famous Smithsonian-sponsored African expedition was being assembled, the Bible was, according to his sister, "the first book selected". In an address delivered to the Long Island Bible Society in 1901, Roosevelt declared that:

Every thinking man, when he thinks, realizes what a very large number of people tend to forget, that the teachings of the Bible are so interwoven and entwined with our whole civic and social life that it would be literally—I do not mean figuratively, I mean literally—impossible for us to figure to ourselves what that life would be if these teachings were removed. We would lose almost all the standards by which we now judge both public and private morals; all the standards toward which we, with more or less of resolution, strive to raise ourselves. Almost every man who has by his lifework added to the sum of human achievement of which the race is proud, has based his lifework largely upon the teachings of the Bible ... Among the greatest men a disproportionately large number have been diligent and close students of the Bible at first hand.

=== Cattle ranching ===
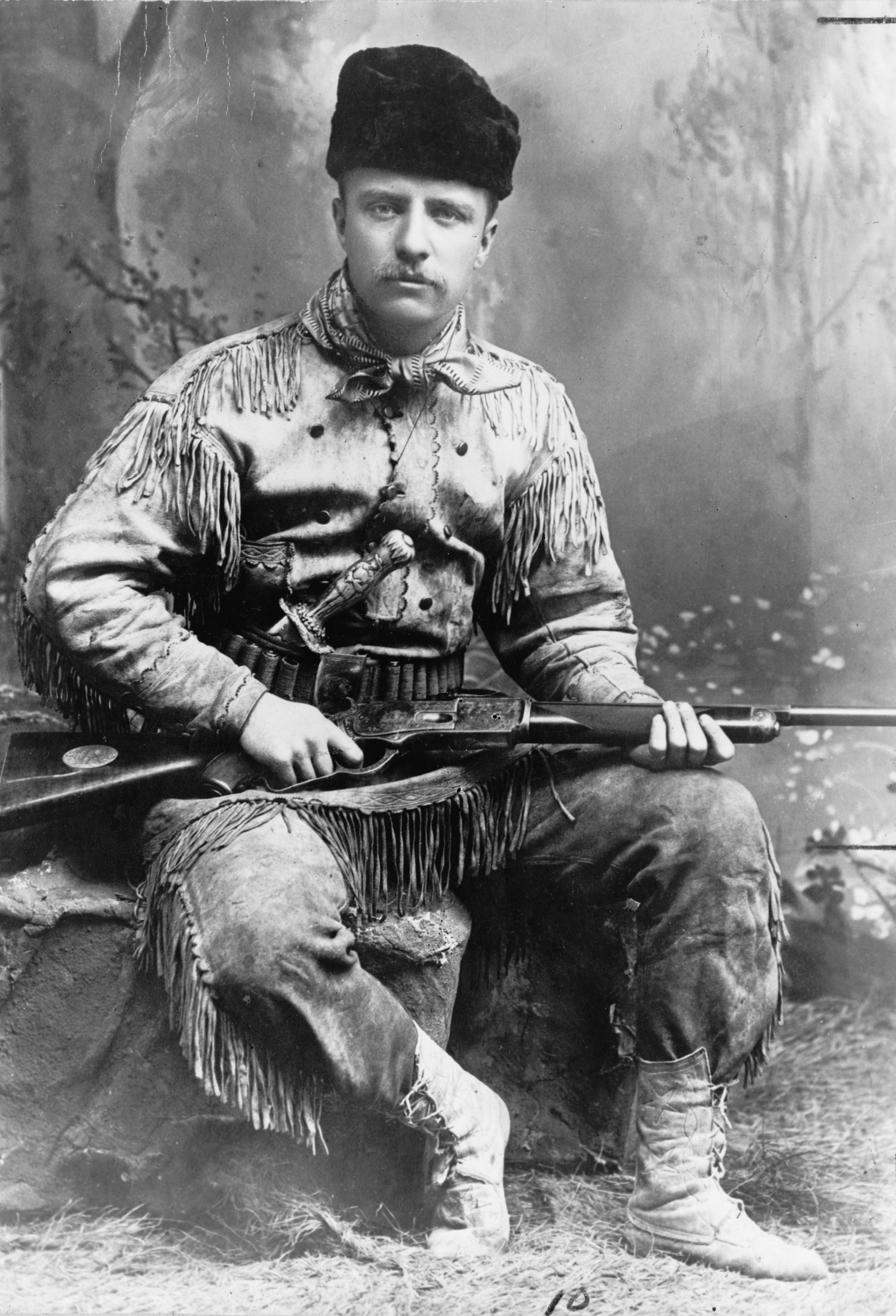
Roosevelt as a Badlands hunter in 1885

Roosevelt first visited the Dakota Territory in 1883 to hunt bison. Exhilarated by the western lifestyle and with the cattle business booming, Roosevelt invested $14,000 (equivalent to $410,000 in 2025) in hope of becoming a prosperous cattle rancher. For several years, he shuttled between his home in New York and ranch in Dakota.

Following the 1884 United States presidential election, Roosevelt built Elkhorn Ranch 35 mi (56 km) north of the boomtown of Medora, North Dakota. Roosevelt learned to ride western style, rope, and hunt on the banks of the Little Missouri. A cowboy, he said, possesses, "few of the emasculated, milk-and-water moralities admired by the pseudo-philanthropists; but he does possess, to a very high degree, the stern, manly qualities that are invaluable to a nation". He wrote about frontier life for national magazines and published books: Hunting Trips of a Ranchman, Ranch Life and the Hunting-Trail, and The Wilderness Hunter.

Roosevelt successfully led efforts to organize ranchers to address the problems of overgrazing and other shared concerns, which resulted in the formation of the Little Missouri Stockmen's Association. He formed the Boone and Crockett Club, whose primary goal was the conservation of large game animals and their habitats. In 1886, Roosevelt served as a deputy sheriff in Billings County, North Dakota. In one incident, when his boat was stolen by three thieves, Roosevelt and two hands pursued the men up the river while Roosevelt finished a volume of Matthew Arnold and Anna Karenina by Leo Tolstoy. Once the men had been apprehended, Roosevelt intended to turn them over to the sheriff’s office in the nearest town. To do so, he enlisted a ranchman to transport the men approximately 45 miles to the sheriff’s office, while he followed on foot to ensure that they did not escape. The pursuit, apprehension, and subsequent transfer of the men into custody took approximately 12 days in total.

The severe winter of 1886–1887 wiped out his herd and over half of his $80,000 investment (equivalent to $2.51 million in 2025). He ended his ranching life and returned to New York, where he escaped the damaging label of an ineffectual intellectual.

== See also ==
- Electoral history of Theodore Roosevelt
- List of famous big game hunters
- List of presidents of the United States
- List of presidents of the United States by previous experience
- Presidents of the United States on U.S. postage stamps
- SS Roosevelt (1905)
- SS President Roosevelt (1921)
- SS President Roosevelt (1944)
- Teddy bear
- Theodore Roosevelt Digital Library

== Sources ==
- Bakari, Mohamed El-Kamel (2016). "Mapping the 'Anthropocentric-ecocentric'Dualism in the History of American Presidency: The Good, the Bad, and the Ambivalent". Journal of Studies in Social Sciences. 14 (2).
- Beale, Howard K. (1956). Theodore Roosevelt and the Rise of America to World Power. Johns Hopkins Press.
- Bishop, Joseph Bucklin (2007). Theodore Roosevelt's Letters to His Children. Wildside Press. ISBN 978-1-434-48394-2.
- Blum, John Morton (1977). The Republican Roosevelt (2nd ed.). Harvard University Press.
- Brands, Henry William (1997). TR: The Last Romantic. Basic Books. ISBN 978-0-465-06958-3.
- Brinkley, Douglas (2009). The Wilderness Warrior: Theodore Roosevelt and the Crusade for America. HarperCollins. ISBN 978-0-06-056528-2.
- Chambers, John W. (1974). Woodward, C. Vann (ed.). Responses of the Presidents to Charges of Misconduct. Delacorte Press. pp. 207–237. ISBN 0-440-05923-2.
- Chessman, G. Wallace (1965). Governor Theodore Roosevelt: The Albany Apprenticeship, 1898–1900.
- Cooper, John Milton (1983). The Warrior and the Priest: Woodrow Wilson and Theodore Roosevelt. Harvard University Press. ISBN 978-0-674-94751-1.
- Cullinane, Michael Patrick (2017). Theodore Roosevelt's Ghost: The History and Memory of an American Icon. LSU Press. ISBN 978-0-8071-6672-7.
- Cunliffe, Marcus (1955). "Theodore Roosevelt, President of the United States 1901–1908". History Today. 4 (9): 592–601.
- Dalton, Kathleen (2002). Theodore Roosevelt: A Strenuous Life. Knopf Doubleday Publishing. ISBN 0-679-76733-9.
- Gould, Lewis L. (2008a). Four Hats in the Ring: The 1912 Election and the Birth of Modern American Politics. University Press of Kansas. ISBN 978-0-7006-1564-3.
- Gould, Lewis L. (2011). The Presidency of Theodore Roosevelt (2nd ed.).
- Gould, Lewis L. (2012). Theodore Roosevelt. Oxford University Press. ISBN 978-0-19-979701-1.
- Harbaugh, William Henry (1963). The Life and Times of Theodore Roosevelt. Farrar, Straus And Cudahy.
- Kissinger, Henry (1994). Diplomacy. Simon & Schuster. ISBN 0-671-51099-1.
- Kohn, Edward P. (2006). "A Necessary Defeat: Theodore Roosevelt and the New York Mayoral Election of 1886". New York History. 87 (2): 205–227. JSTOR 23183358.
- Leuchtenburg, William E. (2015). The American President: From Teddy Roosevelt to Bill Clinton. Oxford University Press.
- McCullough, David (1981). Mornings on Horseback: The Story of an Extraordinary Family, a Vanished Way of Life and the Unique Child Who Became Theodore Roosevelt. Simon & Schuster. ISBN 978-0-7432-1830-6. Archived from the original on April 7, 2015.
- Mears, Dwight S. (2018). The Medal of Honor: The Evolution of America's Highest Military Decoration. University Press of Kansas. ISBN 978-0-7006-2665-6.
- Millard, C (2009). The river of doubt: Theodore Roosevelt's darkest journey.
- Miller, Nathan (1992). Theodore Roosevelt: A Life. William Morrow & Co. ISBN 978-0-688-06784-7.
- Morison, Elting E, ed. (1952). The letters of Theodore Roosevelt. Harvard University Press.
- Morris, Edmund (1979). The Rise of Theodore Roosevelt. Vol. 1. To 1901. Coward, McCann & Geoghegan. ISBN 978-0-698-10783-0.
  - Morris, Edmund (2001). Theodore Rex. Vol. 2. To 1909.
  - Morris, Edmund (2010). Colonel Roosevelt. Vol. 3. Random House. ISBN 978-0-679-60415-0. Archived from the original on March 13, 2022.
- O'Toole, Patricia (2005). When Trumpets Call: Theodore Roosevelt after the White House. Simon & Schuster. ISBN 0-684-86477-0.
- Pringle, Henry F. (1931). Theodore Roosevelt.
- Pringle, Henry F. (1956). Theodore Roosevelt (2nd ed.). Harcourt, Brace.
- Putnam, Carleton (1958). Theodore Roosevelt. Vol. I: The Formative Years.
- Reisner, Christian F. (1922). Roosevelt's Religion. The Abingdon Press.
- Ricard, Serge, ed. (2011). A Companion to Theodore Roosevelt. Wiley. ISBN 978-1-4443-3140-0.
- Ricard, Serge (2014). "H-Diplo Essay No. 116 - The State of Theodore Roosevelt Studies" (PDF). H-Diplo - H-Net network on Diplomatic History and International Affairs, Michigan State University Department of History. Archived from the original (PDF) on October 27, 2014.
- Roosevelt, Theodore (1913). Autobiography. Macmillan.
- ——— (1917). The Foes of Our Own Household. George H. Doran. LCCN 17025965.
- Roosevelt, Theodore (1926). The Works of Theodore Roosevelt, Volumes 1-24 (Memorial ed.). C. Scribner's Sons.
- Roosevelt, Theodore (1989) [1941]. Hart, Albert Bushnell; Ferleger, Herbert Ronald (eds.). "Theodore Roosevelt Association Cyclopedia" (Revised 2nd ed.).
- Roosevelt, Theodore (2001). Brands, HW (ed.). The Selected Letters. Cooper Square Press. ISBN 978-0-8154-1126-0.
- Ruddy, Daniel (2016). Theodore the Great: Conservative Crusader. Regnery History. ISBN 978-1-62157-441-5.
- Samuels, Peggy (1997). Teddy Roosevelt at San Juan: The Making of a President. Texas A&M UP. ISBN 978-0-89096-771-3. Archived from the original on April 7, 2015.
- Testi, Arnaldo (1995). "The gender of reform politics: Theodore Roosevelt and the culture of masculinity". Journal of American History. 81 (4): 1509–1533. doi:10.2307/2081647. JSTOR 2081647. Archived from the original on October 25, 2019.
- Thayer, William Roscoe (1919). Theodore Roosevelt: an intimate biography. Houghton Mifflin.
- Watts, Sarah (2003). Rough Rider in the White House: Theodore Roosevelt and the Politics of Desire.

New York State Assembly
| Preceded by William J. Trimble | Member of the New York Assembly from the 21st district 1882–1884 | Succeeded by Henry A. Barnum |
| Preceded by Thomas G. Alvord | Minority Leader of the New York Assembly; 1883 | Succeeded by Frank Rice |
Civic offices
| Unknown Last known title holder: William Farrar Smith | Superintendent of the New York City Police Department; 1895–1897 | Succeeded by John McCullagh |
Government offices
| Preceded by William McAdoo | Assistant Secretary of the Navy; 1897–1898 | Succeeded by Charles Herbert Allen |
Party political offices
| Preceded by Frank S. Black | Republican nominee for Governor of New York; 1898 | Succeeded by Benjamin Odell |
| Preceded by Garret Hobart | Republican nominee for Vice President of the United States; 1900 | Succeeded by Charles W. Fairbanks |
| Preceded by William McKinley | Republican nominee for President of the United States; 1904 | Succeeded by William Howard Taft |
| New political party | Progressive nominee for President of the United States; 1912 | Party dissolved |
Political offices
| Preceded by Frank S. Black | Governor of New York; 1899–1900 | Succeeded by Benjamin Barker Odell Jr. |
| Preceded by Garret Hobart | Vice President of the United States; 1901 | Succeeded by Charles W. Fairbanks |
| Preceded by William McKinley | President of the United States; 1901–1909 | Succeeded by William Howard Taft |
Awards and achievements
| Preceded by Bertha von Suttner | Laureate of the Nobel Peace Prize; 1906 | Succeeded by Ernesto Teodoro Moneta; Louis Renault |
