= Theodore Roosevelt Cyclopedia =

The Theodore Roosevelt Cyclopedia is a comprehensive project to publish, in one collection, the significant sayings, important conversations and writings (less his letters) of the 26th President of the United States, Theodore Roosevelt. Originally conceived by Dr. Albert Bushnell Hart, a history professor at Harvard University, a personal friend of Roosevelt and member of the Roosevelt Memorial Association, now known as the Theodore Roosevelt Association, Hart's goal was, in his words, to "present in alphabetical arrangement, extracts sufficiently numerous and comprehensive to display all the phases of (Theodore) Roosevelt's activities and opinions as expressed by him." An A-Z online index of the original work is also maintained by the TRA. The 1941 Cyclopedia is out of print, but was made available in a CD-ROM version in 1989, the 1989 version can be found online.

== History of the project ==
Theodore Roosevelt, the 26th U.S. president, popularly known as "TR" and "Teddy" (although Roosevelt despised that name), died on January 6, 1919. Within a few days, the Roosevelt Memorial Association was founded by Roosevelt's friends and associates. The association was formally chartered by special act of Congress, May 31, 1920,

to perpetuate the memory of Theodore Roosevelt for the benefit of the people of the United States of America and the world....

Led in the years 1919–1957 by secretary and director Hermann Hagedorn (1882–1964), poet, author, historian, friend and biographer of Roosevelt, the association engaged in a wide spectrum of programs and activities to preserve his memory.

In the association's Annual Report 1924, Hagedorn announced that "a Roosevelt Cyclopedia or Roosevelt Thesaurus" was being edited by Professor Albert Bushnell Hart of Harvard University. Albert Bushnell Hart (1854–1943) was a classmate of Roosevelt's at Harvard, Class of 1880, and like Roosevelt, a Phi Beta Kappa. Hart received a Ph.D. degree at the University of Freiburg in Germany in 1883, and that same year joined the faculty of Harvard. He taught at Harvard 1883–1926. One of the first generation of professionally trained historians in the United States, a prolific author and editor of historical works, Albert Bushnell Hart became, as Samuel Eliot Morison says, "The Grand Old Man" of American history, looking the part with his "patriarchal full beard and flowing moustaches." Hart was a devoted friend and follower of Theodore Roosevelt, and was elected as a Roosevelt delegate to the Republican convention of 1912.

He became an enthusiastic trustee and supporter of the Roosevelt Memorial Association, and said that from the time of Roosevelt's death he had the idea of editing a Roosevelt-centered cyclopedia. The projected reference work would, Hart explained, "present in alphabetical arrangement extracts sufficiently numerous and comprehensive to display all the phases of Roosevelt's activities and opinions as expressed by him." He wrote Hagedorn: "What we are after is the crisp, sharp, biting sparks that flew from the Roosevelt brain." Hart told the survivors of the Harvard Class of 1880 that editing the cyclopedia "will be a very interesting and agreeable service to the memory of our great classmate."

== Initial problems and new leadership ==
But from the beginning the project was plagued with problems. Hart's time was taken up with other commitments. He was editor of the American Year Book, 1926–1932, edited a five-volume history of Massachusetts in 1927–1930, and worked as the official historian of the George Washington bicentennial commission in the 1920s and 1930s. Hart had to postpone the cyclopedia, and asked the association for research and clerical staff.

But the executive committee of the Roosevelt Memorial Association delayed appropriations for the cyclopedia, because the expense was "so great," and it was not until May 1928 that a budget was approved for the cyclopedia, although the project had been publicly announced years before. Finally, in 1931 Hart presented a rough draft of the cyclopedia to Hagedorn. But the book needed much more work. By now the elderly Hart "began to decline," wrote Samuel Eliot Morison; and Hagedorn reported to the RMA Executive Committee that Hart could not finish the project "because of his advanced years."

In 1939, Hagedorn assigned the cyclopedia to Herbert Ronald Ferleger (1914–1973), a graduate student and professional researcher who had done work for the association. Ferleger, who graduated from Temple University in 1934, had been a research fellow at the Brookings Institution, and had taught at Princeton. He received a Ph.D. in political science from Columbia University in 1942. Ferleger completed his work in 1940. William Allen White (1868–1944), the editor of the Emporia Gazette, Emporia, Kansas, a respected and beloved public figure and a trustee of the association who had been a close friend of TR's, wrote a foreword for the book.

== Roosevelt Cyclopedia completed ==
On January 6, 1941, the Theodore Roosevelt Cyclopedia was published by the association. The total costs to the RMA from 1928 to 1941 in salaries, printing, and other expenses came to $22,509.52. In the final analysis, The Theodore Roosevelt Cyclopedia represented the vision and plan of Albert Bushnell Hart, the dedication and patience of Hermann Hagedorn, and the research and hard work of Herbert Ronald Ferleger.

Lawrence F. Abbott, who worked with TR when the former president was contributing editor of the Outlook magazine, once estimated that Roosevelt published perhaps 2,500,000 words, and wrote a total of maybe 18,000,000 words when his letters are included in the count. About 550,000 words are in the Theodore Roosevelt Cyclopedia.

== The final work ==
The Theodore Roosevelt Cyclopedia, published in 1941, consists of 674 pages with well over 4,000 quotations arranged alphabetically by topic or subject, from "Abbey Theatre" to "Youth." Thousands of topics and subjects are listed, counting the extensive cross-reference entries. The original source of each quotation is given, and if the passage appears in the Charles Scribner's Sons editions of the Works of Theodore Roosevelt (1923–1926), volume and page numbers are listed for the National (20 volumes) and/or Memorial (24 volumes) editions. A guide or chart for the Scribner's Memorial and National editions is provided in the "Editors' Note" at the beginning of the Cyclopedia, listing the basic contents of each volume.

Most of the quotations are taken from the Scribner's editions of the Works of Theodore Roosevelt, but approximately 380 quotations in the Cyclopedia, not counting excerpts from letters, are from articles, speeches, and other sources not included in the Scribner's editions. Additionally, over forty recorded conversations are quoted, most of these not in the Scribner's editions. The editors of the Cyclopedia, Albert Bushnell Hart and Herbert Ronald Ferleger, unfortunately, did not make use of the unpublished letters in the Theodore Roosevelt Papers at the Library of Congress or of other collections of unpublished papers. And the eight-volume Letters of Theodore Roosevelt, based on the Theodore Roosevelt Papers at the Library of Congress and other collections, came out in the 1950s, and therefore was not available to the editors.

Only one unpublished letter is quoted in the Cyclopedia: TR to the Rev. William W. Moir, October 10, 1898, pp. 534–535, explaining how to pronounce the name Roosevelt. Fortunately, however, many published TR letters were available to the editors in the 1920s and 1930s, most notably in Theodore Roosevelt's Letters to His Children (1919), covering the years 1898–1911, edited by Joseph Bucklin Bishop, included in both Scribner's National and Memorial editions; Letters from Theodore Roosevelt to Anna Roosevelt Cowles, 1870-1918 (1924); Selections from the Correspondence of Theodore Roosevelt and Henry Cabot Lodge, 1884-1918 (1925), two volumes; My Brother Theodore Roosevelt (1921) by Corinne Roosevelt Robinson; and Theodore Roosevelt and His Time, Shown in His Letters (1920), two volumes, by Joseph Bucklin Bishop, included in the Memorial edition.

Bishop, whose biography had been authorized by TR before the former President's death, had complete access to what became the collection of Theodore Roosevelt Papers at the Library of Congress. Over 670 quotations in the Cyclopedia are from letters by Roosevelt.

== Topics in the Cyclopedia ==
The topics and subjects included in the Theodore Roosevelt Cyclopedia cover the full range of TR's activities and opinions. Issues of TR's times, like "Silver Issue," "Recall of Judicial Decisions," and "Trust Legislation," and periods and events in Roosevelt's career, such as "New York Assembly-Roosevelt's Service in," "Governor of New York," and "Roosevelt's Reception in Europe" (1910), are listed in the Cyclopedia. Roosevelt's views on the historical events of his era, such as "Spanish–American War," "Russo-Japanese War," "Panic of 1907" and "Election of 1916," are given.

Some 149 people are listed as subjects in the Cyclopedia, from historical figures before TR's times, like Oliver Cromwell, Frederick the Great, and John Marshall, to Roosevelts's contemporaries, including Jane Addams, William Jennings Bryan, Mark Hanna, Augustus Saint-Gaudens, Pancho Villa, Woodrow Wilson and Booker T. Washington. Roosevelt's comments on writers are given, from Dante to Dickens to Edwin Arlington Robinson.

Institutions, groups, and organizations, such as the Methodist Church, Mugwumps, Y.M.C.A., U.S. Senate, Audubon Societies, and Progressive Party, are listed. Birds and animals—ousel, wapiti, elephant, mocking-bird, moose, and many others—are described in the words of the hunter-naturalist TR. Historical topics from before Roosevelt's era are covered, including the fall of the Roman Empire, the Mongol Invasions, the French Revolution, and the War of 1812. Many of the entries in the Cyclopedia are general topics, like "citizenship," "experts in government," "ideals," "reading," "tolerance," "women in politics," and "scholarship." Other entries are specific references, such as "Socialism in Sweden," "Standard Oil Company, "Bryce's American Commonwealth," and "Northern Securities Case."

Theodore Roosevelt was a great phrase-maker and coiner of terms, and most of his famous slogans, epithets, titles, sayings, and characterizations are listed in the Cyclopedia, including "lunatic fringe," "Square Deal," "malefactors of great wealth," "Big Stick," "muck-rakers," "Bull Moose," "nature fakers," "polyglot boarding house," "weasel words," "New Nationalism," "broomstick preparedness," and "strenuous life." A few others, however, are not in the Cyclopedia, such as "Ananias Club" (liars) and "bully pulpit" (the White House).

Unfortunately, the editors made no systematic attempt to trace or indicate the origin and first use of a term or phrase. The earliest use is often given, but not in all cases. This failure to include notes on the history of phrases and terms is a real limitation in the Cyclopedia as a reference work. The editors were clearly more interested in presenting Roosevelt's thought than in producing a guide to familiar quotations, though most of the famous quotations were included in the book. The quotations given are often lengthy, thereby preserving much of the original context, and providing an accurate view of Roosevelt's thinking.

Usually quotations on a topic are taken from a variety of sources over a period of many years, thus showing the development and the remarkable degree of continuity in TR's thought. In some cases, the quotations selected do not give the full scope of Roosevelt's opinions on a particular subject. For instance, only favorable remarks are quoted for William McKinley and M. La Follette Sr., whereas TR was also critical of both leaders, particularly Senator La Follette. But on most subjects an accurate, balanced, and full picture of TR's thinking is given. For instance, the quotations on William Howard Taft show TR's changing views of a man who was at one time a close friend and associate and later a political opponent.

Likewise, the coverage of the Panama Canal is thorough. Many of the remarks quoted are candid and colorful, and the private as well as the public Roosevelt is revealed in the Cyclopedia. Anyone familiar with TR's words will probably regret that some particular quotations were not included in the Cyclopedia. But on the whole, the editors did an excellent job in selecting quotations that show the totality of the many-sided Roosevelt.

== Strengths and weaknesses ==
The chief weaknesses of the Cyclopedia are, as noted, that the editors did not use the then unpublished letters by TR, and did not trace the roots or indicate the first uses of famous phrases and key concepts. The strengths of the Theodore Roosevelt Cyclopedia are many. The choice of topics and subjects is almost exhaustive of the possibilities. The book is thoroughly cross-referenced. The editors used a wide variety of sources, from speeches and state papers to recorded conversations and letters to family members, from little-known articles to Roosevelt's numerous books. The quotations given are for the most part well-chosen, and care was taken to present views on a particular topic expressed over a wide span of time, and to give a full and accurate summary of Roosevelt's thought.

No attempt was made to tailor Roosevelt's views to fit the ideological fashions of later periods. Roosevelt "in his miraculous abundance," as William Allen White said, is found in the Cyclopedia. The editors indeed accomplished their stated purpose: to present in one volume "the essence of Theodore Roosevelt-the ideals, principles, and convictions for which he lived; the thoughts, views, and opinions he expressed on a multitude of issues." The Theodore Roosevelt Cyclopedia is a valuable scholarly work that will remain of use as long as anyone is interested in him.

The Cyclopedia is now available in CD format and there is a primitive online version of the work at the Theodore Roosevelt Association's web site. There is ongoing discussion on updating that Web publication into a full-featured web-enabled system.

== Modern work on digitization of Theodore Roosevelt's materials ==
Ongoing discussion is taking place both at the Harvard's Houghton Library, the Theodore Roosevelt Association and at Dickinson State University Dickinson State TR papers digitization project for information on the digitizing of Roosevelt's papers, correspondence, articles, and photos.

== See also ==
- Theodore Roosevelt Association
- Theodore Roosevelt
