= Albert Bushnell Hart =

American historian and scholar

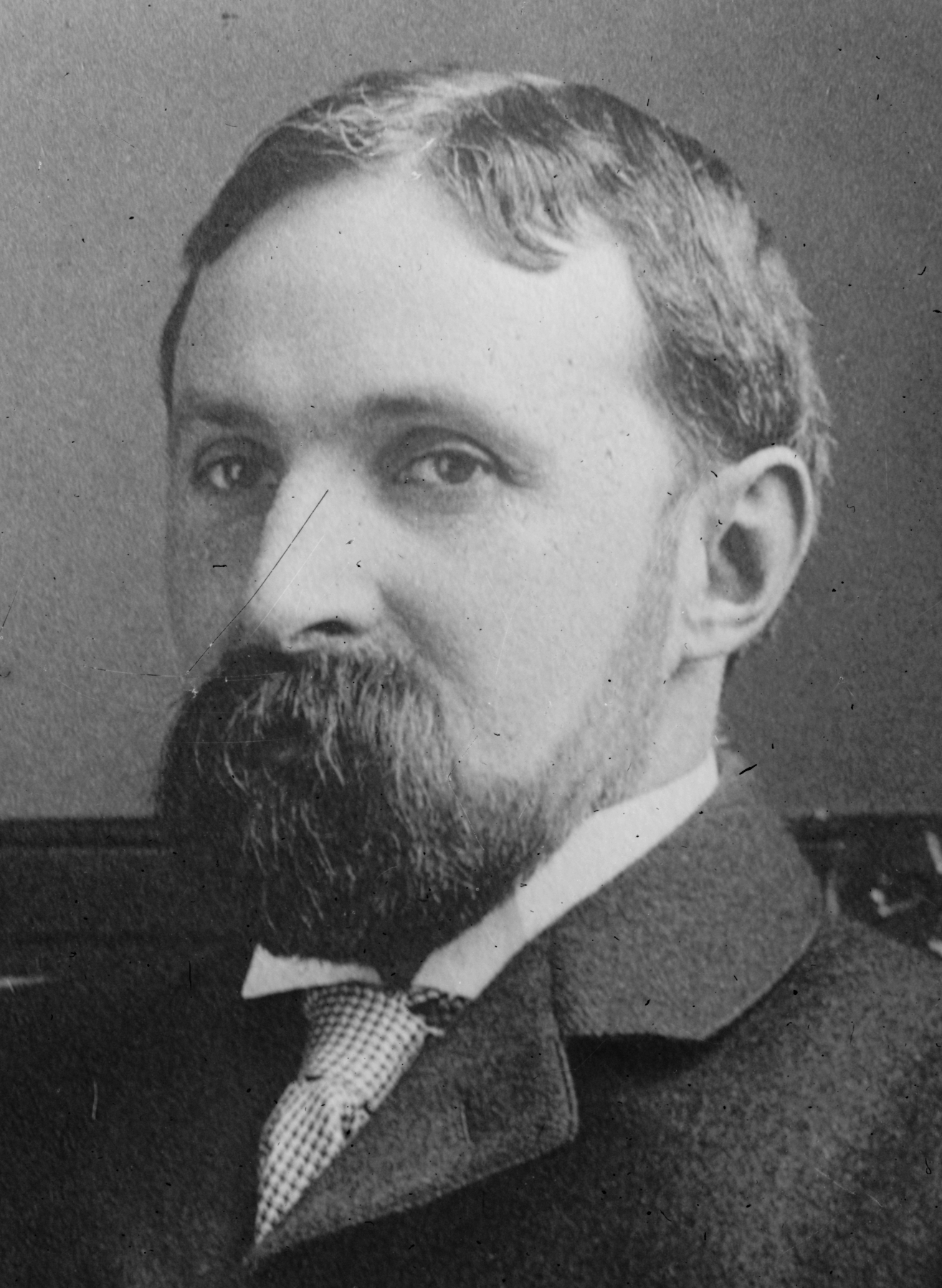
- Born: July 1, 1854; Clarksville, Pennsylvania, U.S.
- Died: July 16, 1943 (aged 89); Boston, Massachusetts, U.S.

Academic background
- Education: Harvard University (AB); University of Paris; University of Berlin; University of Freiburg (PhD)
- Thesis: The Coercive Powers of the Government of the United States of America (1883)
- Doctoral advisor: Hermann Eduard von Holst

Academic work
- Doctoral students: W. E. B. Du Bois; Frederic L. Paxson; Herman Vandenburg Ames; Carter G. Woodson

Albert Bushnell Hart (July 1, 1854 – July 16, 1943) was an American historian, writer, and editor based at Harvard University. One of the first generation of professionally trained historians in the United States, a prolific author and editor of historical works, Albert Bushnell Hart became, as Samuel Eliot Morison described him, "The Grand Old Man" of American history, looking the part with his "patriarchal full beard and flowing moustaches."

== Biography ==
Hart was born in Clarksville, Pennsylvania (now known as Clark), and grew up in Cleveland, Ohio, graduating from West High School in 1870. He graduated from Harvard University in 1880. While at Harvard, he was a member of Phi Beta Kappa and a classmate and friend of future U.S. President Theodore Roosevelt. He studied at Paris, Berlin and Freiburg, and received his doctorate under Hermann Eduard von Holst at Freiburg in 1883. Harvard President Charles Eliot appointed Hart an instructor in 1883 to teach the only course in American history that the college offered, despite the fact that Edward Channing, already an assistant in European history, wanted to teach the course himself. Hart served as instructor in history from 1883 to 1887, assistant professor from 1887 to 1897, and became a professor in 1897. In 1910 he was appointed Eaton Professor of the Science of Government. He was on the Harvard faculty for 43 years, retiring in 1926. In retirement he continued to write and edit from a room in Widener Library. He maintained a summer home in New Hampshire near Mount Monadnock.

Hart edited, along with Edward Channing, over the period from 1892 to 1895 a series of extracts from primary documents called the "American history leaflets; colonial and constitutional", which included titles such as "Extracts from the Sagas describing the voyages to Vinland", and "Documents illustrating the territorial development of the United States, 1584–1774". Hart was an editor of the Harvard Graduates' Magazine from 1894 to 1902. He served as president of the American Historical Association in 1909 and of the American Political Science Association in 1912. In 1914, he was appointed exchange professor at the University of Berlin.

Hart authored Formation of the Union (1892), Salmon Portland Chase (1899), Essentials of American History (1905), Slavery and Abolition (1906), and many other books. He was editor of the "American Nation" series (28 volumes, 1903–1918) and other series on American history, of many source books and guides for the study of American history, and, with Andrew C. McLaughlin, of the Cyclopedia of American Government (3 volumes, 1914). He was an editor of the American Historical Review for 14 years, and president of both the American Historical Association (AHA) and the American Political Science Association. Hart edited the American Year Book from 1911 to 1920 and from 1926 to 1932. He edited a five-volume history of Massachusetts in 1927–1930 and worked as the official historian of the George Washington bicentennial commission from 1926 to 1932.

In 1909, he played an important role in enabling his former student, W. E. B. Du Bois, to deliver his paper "Reconstruction and Its Benefits" to the AHA in New York. This essay was elaborated as the book Black Reconstruction in America in 1935 and proved to be a seminal work in moving historical discussion of the Reconstruction period away from the views of the Dunning School. He served as a trustee of Howard University. Though a believer in the racial inferiority of African Americans, he nevertheless opposed plans to deny black students places in the Freshman Halls at Harvard in the years following World War I. Aside from being the advisor for Du Bois' doctoral dissertation, Hart was also the advisor (along with Edward Channing) for Carter G. Woodson's dissertation. Hart was also the initial doctoral advisor for another African-American historian, Charles H. Wesley, and arranged for Wesley to receive the same Austin Scholar Graduate Fellowship that Du Bois had received thirty years earlier; and as a Howard University trustee, Hart used his influence to secure Wesley a leave of absence so he could complete his doctorate. However, since Hart was on academic leave that semester, Channing served as Wesley's dissertation advisor.

A proponent of U.S. participation in World War I, he was accused of espionage in December 1918, but the charges were determined to be the work of German propagandists trying to undermine his pro-British stance. In 1922, The Progressive Magazine referred to Hart as an Anglomaniac.

In the fall of 1915, he served on the Mooseheart Governing Board, and remained in that role through 1928. The 1928 edition of Seniors' Book is dedicated in his honor.

A discussion arose in 1923 as to the "Americanism" of his history textbooks Epochs of American History and National Ideals Historically Traced. An investigating committee suggested the removal of his School History of the United States from New York City schools.

Hart married Mary Putnam in 1889, and they adopted twin boys in 1897. He died on July 16, 1943. Although Hart had agreed that all of his papers would go to Harvard after his death, his papers were sold by his sons through book dealers in Newburyport, and the college attempted to recover as many as possible.

== On lynchings ==
In December 1900, the New York World reported on Hart making a remark before the American Historical Association in Detroit to the effect that "if the people of certain States are determined to burn colored men at the stake, those States would better legalize the practice". In a similar vein he suggested in an article in the North American Review that "Perhaps something might be accomplished by special courts set up on the model of similar tribunals in slavery times, with power to deal with certain aggravated crimes outside the technicality of ordinary criminal law." Hart goes on in the same article to argue:

Lynching is approved by most Southern whites, as is shown by the fact that nobody has ever been severely punished for taking part in a lynching; but it is the worst and most ineffective of remedies for race troubles. Lynchings frequently degenerate into mere orgies of blood. As a young Southern white says: "You don't understand how we feel down here: when there is a row, we feel like killing a nigger whether he has done anything or not." These extraordinary remedies are not necessary if the white people of the South will make their own courts and sheriffs do their duty,…and disgrace and drive out of society men who take upon themselves the hangman's office.

In his review of Lynch-Law: An Investigation into the History of Lynching in the United States by James Elbert Cutler (1905) published in the American Historical Review, Hart takes on the myth that African Americans were lynched because they were rapists, an accusation that did not hold up to statistical scrutiny:

An examination into the causes for lynching is much more suggestive and throws a new light upon the relation of lynching to race hostility. Of the 2,585 persons lynched in the South 1,985 were negroes; and we are all perfectly familiar with the statement, repeated by Southern writers and doubtless believed, that practically all these lynchings are for rape, for which it is supposed no legal penalty is sufficiently terrible and sufficiently drastic. As a matter of fact, out of the 1,985 negroes lynched, 783 were charged with murder, 707 or an average of thirty-two a year with rape (to which should be added 109 white men, or five a year, lynched for the same offense); while there are unquestioned cases of lynching of negroes for such crimes as slander, poisoning horses, throwing stones, being troublesome, and slapping a child. All arguments based upon the theory that the practice of lynching negroes is primarily due to rape absolutely disappear in the face of this statistical demonstration that two-thirds of the lynchings of negroes are for quite other and disconnected causes.

Hart wrote the entry on "Lynching" in Cyclopedia of American Government (1914), where he referred to it as "not simply extra-legal but anti-legal. It assumes guilt in many cases where guilt cannot be proved and in some cases where it does not exist; it sometimes includes manifestly innocent persons, as the negro woman who was burned at the stake by a mob because she had fled with her husband who had committed a crime."

== Efforts to collect the writings of Theodore Roosevelt ==
Hart was a devoted friend and follower of Theodore Roosevelt and was elected as a Roosevelt delegate to the Republican convention of 1912. He became an enthusiastic trustee and supporter of the Roosevelt Memorial Association, now called the Theodore Roosevelt Association and said that from the time of TR's death he had the idea to "present in alphabetical arrangement extracts sufficiently numerous and comprehensive to display all the phases of Roosevelt's activities and opinions as expressed by him." This work would eventually be called the Theodore Roosevelt Cyclopedia.

Hart wrote Herman Hagedorn of the Association: "What we are after is the crisp, sharp, biting sparks that flew from the Roosevelt brain." Hart told the survivors of the Harvard Class of 1880 that editing the cyclopedia "will be a very interesting and agreeable service to the memory of our great classmate." From the beginning, however, the project was plagued with problems simply because Hart was very busy with many other commitments. Hart had to postpone the cyclopedia, and he asked the Association for research and clerical staff, but the Executive Committee of the Roosevelt Memorial Association delayed appropriations for the cyclopedia, because the expense was "so great," and it was not until May 1928 that a budget was approved for the cyclopedia, although the project had been publicly announced years before. Finally in 1931, Hart presented a rough draft of the cyclopedia to Hagedorn. But the book needed much more work and the elderly Hart "began to decline" and Hagedorn reported to the RMA Executive Committee that Hart could not finish the project "because of his advanced years."

It appeared in 1941 as The Theodore Roosevelt Cyclopedia, edited by Albert Bushnell Hart and Herbert Ronald Ferleger.

== Notable quotes ==
"'Good wine needs no bush', and if there were need to urge the reading of history it would be proof that history is too dull and unattractive to be read." ("How to Study History", in Studies in American Education, 1895)

"For all the weary hours spent over bibliographies and source books and textbooks, at the end of fifty years I have the satisfaction of believing that I was one of a group of young men who made history and government vital subjects for college and graduate school." (Harvard College Class of 1880, Fiftieth Anniversary Report, 1930)

"I believe that the best thing for the happiness of American and of other people is for us to remain within our present boundaries, and give our strength to governing ourselves well. I don't want Hawaii nor Cuba nor Mexico nor Canada as a free and peaceable gift." (Albert Bushnell Hart to Theodore Roosevelt, January 11, 1896, quoted in Baird, 143)

== Publications ==
=== Author ===
- Introduction to the Study of Federal Government (1890) (2nd ed. 1891)
- Why the South Was Defeated in the Civil War (1891)
- Epochs of American History (3 vols.) (1891–1893) (with Reuben Gold Thwaites and Woodrow Wilson). "The Colonies, 1492–1750" (1891), "Formation of the Union, 1750–1829" (1892), "Division and Reunion, 1829–1889" (1893).
- Epoch Maps, Illustrating American History (1891)
- Practical Essays on American Government (1893)
- Studies in American Education (1895)
- Guide to the Study of American History, with Edward Channing (1897); 2nd ed. with Edward Channing and Frederick Jackson Turner (1912)
- Salmon Portland Chase (1899, in the American Statesman series)
- Foundations of American Foreign Policy (1901)
- Actual Government (1903)
- Slavery and Abolition (1906, in the American Nation series, covering 1831–1842)
- National Ideals Historically Traced (1907)
- Manual of American History, Diplomacy, and Government (1908)
- Imagination in History (1909)
- The Southern South (1910); focus on race relations; influential survey
- Formation of the Union (1910)
- The Obvious Orient (1911)
- The War in Europe (1914); vol. 26 of the American Nation series
- The Monroe Doctrine: An Interpretation (1916)
- New American History (1917)
- School History of the United States (1917)
- America at War (1917)
- Causes of the War (1920)
- We and Our History (1923)

=== Editor ===
- American history leaflets; colonial and constitutional.
- The Romance of the Civil War (1896)
- American History told by Contemporaries (4 vols, 1898–1901)
- Source Readers in American History (4 vols, 1901–1903)
- Epochs of American History series (3 small text-books)
- American Nation series (27 vols, 1903–1907)
- American Citizen series
- Cyclopedia of American Government (3 vols.) (1914) (co-edited by Andrew C. McLaughlin)
- Colonial Children, edited with Blanche E. Hazard (1914)
- Harper's Pictorial Library of the World War, Volume 1 (1920)
- Commonwealth History of Massachusetts (five volumes, 1927–1930; Hart also contributed essays to the collection)

== See also ==
- Theodore Roosevelt Association
