= Theodore Roosevelt Monument Assemblage =

Monument in Theodore Roosevelt Memorial Park in New York, United States

Coordinates: 40°52′35.65″N 73°31′54.43″W

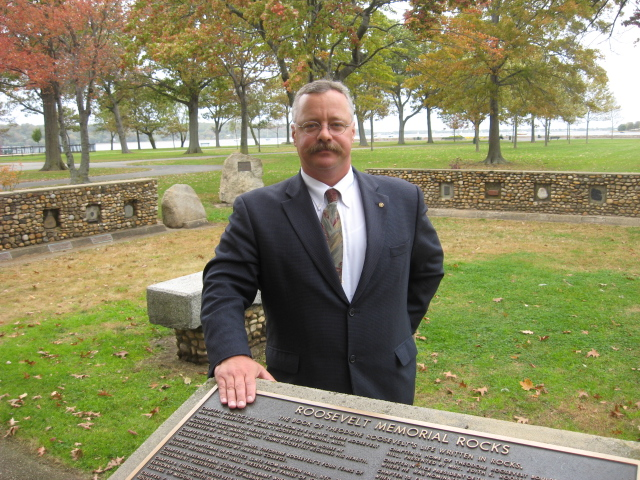
Theodore Roosevelt re-enactor Joe Wiegand beside the Theodore Roosevelt Monument Assemblage in Theodore Roosevelt Memorial Park

The Theodore Roosevelt Monument Assemblage is a collection of 24 stones and plaque located in the Theodore Roosevelt Memorial Park in Oyster Bay, New York. The stones and other objects are meant to each represent a "chapter" and together form a "book" telling the story of Theodore Roosevelt, 26th President of the United States.

== Inscription from plaque, 1991 ==
The full text of the plaque from the 1991 rededication follows, with description of the monument as a whole and individual objects and stones:

ROOSEVELT MEMORIAL ROCKS

The Book of Theodore Roosevelt's Life Written in Rocks

Chapter 1. Born Oct. 27, 1858. Brick from 28 E 20 NYC Where Roosevelt was born. Presented by Women's Roosevelt Memorial Assn.

Chapter 2. Regaining his health granite step from house at Moosehead Lake, Maine, where young Roosevelt regained his health.

Chapter 3. From Cambridge, Mass. Theodore Roosevelt's four years of college life. Presented by Harvard College.

Chapter 4. Baptismal in politics slate from Morton Hall, NYC. 21st District Republican Assembly Hall. Presented by family of Joe Murray.

Chapter 5. Assemblyman stone from Albany where Roosevelt entered government. Presented by City of Albany.

Chapter 6. Theodore Roosevelt in cowboy land. Boulder from Elkhorn Ranch, North Dakota. Presented February 1924 by Village of Medora.

Chapter 7. Civil Service commissioner of NYC stone from Roosevelt House. Presented by Police Captain Edward J. Bourke.

Chapter 8. Police Commissioner of NYC brick from Mulberry Street Station where Roosevelt made history. Presented by Mrs. Jacob Riis.

Chapter 9. Assistant Secretary of the Navy Boulder from Rock Creek Park in Washington, D.C. Presented by the city.

Chapter 10. Rough Riders to Victory boulder from San Juan Hill. Presented by J. Louis Shaefer.

Chapter 11. Governor of New York State stone from Camp Black in Montauk Point where he agreed to run for governor. Presented by the Town of North Hempstead.

Chapter 12. Reconstruction of the barge canals boulder from the Erie Canal in Herkimer. Presented by NY State Engineers office.

Chapter 13. Home of Theodore Roosevelt boulder from Sagamore Hill. Presented by Mrs. Edith Roosevelt.

Chapter 14. Vice President of the United States stone from the Philadelphia home where he was nominated Vice President. Presented by the city.

Chapter 15. From the Adirondacks where Theodore Roosevelt was when he became President of the United States. Presented August 1921 by P. Thure Brorstrom.

Chapter 16. Oath of office 1901 stone from Wilcox House, Buffalo, where he took the oath of office. Presented by James W. Dowsey.

Chapter 17. From Roosevelt Dam, Arizona. President Roosevelt preservation of the natural resources of the nation. Presented by City of Roosevelt, Arizona.

Chapter 18. The big coal strike piece of coal from the Pennsylvania anthracite mines where he conquered the strike. Presented by Gov. Gifford Pinchot.

Chapter 19. Greatest acquirement boulder from Culebra Cut Panama Canal. Presented by Mrs. Lillius Grace.

Chapter 20. Russo-Japanese War boulder from Portsmouth, N.H., where he settled the war. Presented by city.

Chapter 21. A native rock Theodore Roosevelt in his big stick and square deal. Presented August 1923 by city.

Chapter 22. Battle fleet round world 7 inch shell from US Navy, for his biggest peace move. Presented by M. B. Brorstrom.

Chapter 23. Author and man bronze book representing the life of Theodore Roosevelt as author of 31 books. Presented by Mrs. Lillian Tatters Bussenius.

Chapter 24. Died January 6th 1919. 60 years, 2 months and 9 days.

Dedicated in Great Neck June 10, 1922
Rededicated when moved to Oyster Bay Oct. 25, 1947
Rededicated with this plaque June 23, 1991

While plaques for several individual stones in the monument are missing (8, 4, 18, 5, 1, 23, 16, 20, 17), text from remaining plaques follows:

Chapter 2. Step from house in Maine where young Roosevelt regained his health. Presented Feb. 1923 by W.W. Sewall.

Chapter 7. From New York City Theodore Roosevelt as Civil Service Commissioner. Presented Aug. 1923 by Capt. Edward J. Bourke.

Chapter 11. From Montauk Point where col. Roosevelt agreed to run as Governor of New York State. Presented March 1923 by Town of North Hempstead.

Chapter 21. A native rock. Theodore Roosevelt in his big stick and square deal. Presented Aug. 1923 by County of Nassau.

Chapter 22. From United States Navy, President Roosevelt's great peace move. Battle fleet round the world. Presented in 1921 by M.B. Brorstrom

== Theodore Roosevelt Monument Assemblage Map ==
Map with numbers showing location of stones by chapter:

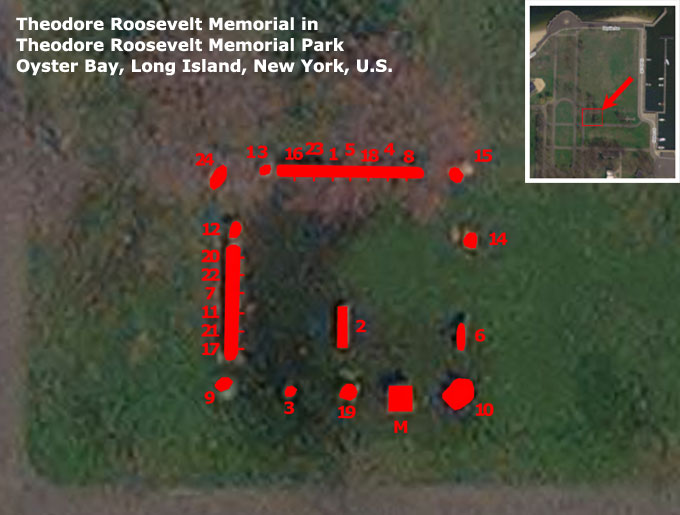

== History and background ==
At the heart of the monument is the first and largest of the boulders, dedicated on Palm Sunday, April 13, 1919. A plaque affixed to this stone reads:

Roosevelt Memorial Oak to the Sacred Memory of THEODORE ROOSEVELT the Great American PRESIDENT of the UNITED STATES 1901-1908

Planted Palm Sunday 1919 A.D. by Paul Brorstrom

Paul Brorstrom assembled a collection of boulders in his Kings Park estate to write the life of President Roosevelt in rocks.

Three boulders formed the nucleus for the monument dedicated at his Great Neck estate on June 10, 1922. One boulder was taken from Sagamore Hill recognizing Roosevelt's ties to Oyster Bay where his home was located. The second boulder was taken from San Juan Hill where Col. Roosevelt led a famous charge with his Rough Riders in the Spanish–American War. The final boulder from the Adirondack Mountains served as a reminder of where Roosevelt was upon being informed he would become president of the United States.

These were maintained in Kings Point by John Eggers, who, at the desire of the family, presented them to the town. The three original stones grew to a collection of 24 items including the first boulder dedicated immediately after Roosevelt's death, the three additional boulders dedicated in 1922, and several other boulders, stones, bricks, a large granite step, and other items relating to Roosevelt's life story and political accomplishments.

Six stones are documented as having been added between 1921 and 1924. The first from the United States Navy, recognizing Roosevelt's "great peace move, battle fleet round the world" was presented in 1921 by M.B. Brorstrom. This is odd because this stone is not included among the three that were dedicated the next year in 1922.

The five remaining stones were added after the 1922 dedication. These include: Chapter 11 from Montauk Point, presented March 1923 by the Town of North Hempstead; Chapter 2 from the step of a house in Maine presented February 1923 by W.W. Sewall; Chapter 7 from New York City where Roosevelt served as Civil Service Commissioner presented August 1923 by Capt. Edward J. Bourke; Chapter 21 presented by Nassau County in August 1923; and Chapter 6 from North Dakota, presented February 1924 by the Village of Medora.

These six stones, the three that were dedicated in 1922, and the original stone dedicated Palm Sunday 1919 brought the total of stones up to ten. That would leave 14 additional stones that may have been added before 1924 and whose plaques are today missing, or that were added sometime after 1924 and whose plaques also are missing.

The expanded Theodore Roosevelt Monument was moved and rededicated at the Theodore Roosevelt Memorial Park in Oyster Bay on October 25, 1947. James L. Dowsey of Manhasset, former Nassau County attorney and Republican leader of the town of North Hempstead, who had made a dedication speech twenty-five years ago on the Brorstrom estate, was the principal speaker. The gathering was attended by 100 township officials, friends of the late President, members of his family, and a delegation of social science teachers of Nassau County headed by Jesse Merritt, county historian. Quentin Roosevelt, grandson of the former president and son of Brig. Gen. Theodore Roosevelt Jr., who died in the battlefield in Normandy in World War II, made an address of acceptance for the family. Supervisor Harry Tappen accepted the gift for the township.

The park had been presented formally by the Theodore Roosevelt Association to the Town of Oyster Bay on January 1, 1943. This was the perfect place to move the memorial, giving greater weight and meaning to "memorial" in the title "Theodore Roosevelt Memorial Park."

Further changes to the memorial involved more additions or re-arrangement of existing items between 1947 and present day. Evidence of this comes from a New York Times article published on October 26, 1947, that refers to "A rock from Wilcox House, Buffalo, makes Chapter 12." On the plaque as it stands in 2008, this same rock is indicated as part of Chapter 16, not 12.

== Restoration and maintenance needs ==
Information on the monument was compiled and included in the Smithsonian American Art Museum's Inventories of American Painting and Sculpture database in June 1994. Surveyors described the condition of the memorial as "treatment urgent."

Since that time no known work has been done to stabilize the monument. Several plaques describing the source of artifacts and stones have been removed and presumably stolen. The ground the memorial is situated upon tends to get moist very easily and standing water is frequently visible. Several of the stones have visible cracks, some of which are growing, and that might ultimately cause the stones to split. Attempts to repair other stones have left caulk and other filling materials that are out-of-character with the color and texture of the stone on which they are applied.
