= University of Florida Panama and the Canal Collection =

Digital library

The University of Florida Panama and the Canal Collection includes materials from the University of Florida Libraries' Government Documents Department, the UF Libraries' Latin American Collection, the UF Libraries' Map & Imagery Library, and other shared collections including the Panama and the Canal Digital Collection, which is in collaboration with the Panama Canal Museum. The UF Libraries' Government Documents Department is also the Center of Excellence for the US Panama Canal Commission (and its predecessor agencies).

Ernest "Red" Hallen's photographs make up a large portion of the University of Florida Panama and the Canal Collection.
