= John Allen Gable =

American historian (1943–2005)

Executive Director of the Theodore Roosevelt Association
- In office 1974 – February 2005
- Succeeded by: Edward Renehan Jr.

Personal details
- Born: 1943 Rockford, Illinois, U.S.
- Died: February 18, 2005 (aged 62) Glen Cove, New York, U.S.
- Education: Kenyon College; Brown University
- Occupation: Historian
- Known for: Expertise on Theodore Roosevelt

John Allen Gable (1943, Rockford - February 18, 2005, Glen Cove) was an American historian who specialized in Theodore Roosevelt. Executive director of the Theodore Roosevelt Association from 1974 until his death in 2005, Gable was described as a "walking Theodore Roosevelt encyclopedia" by Bill Bleyer of Newsday. Marcelle Fischer of the New York Times wrote in 2006 that Gable was "widely considered to be the country's, if not the world's, foremost expert on Roosevelt."

== Early life ==
Gable was born to Allen H. and Mary Jane Gable in 1943 in Rockford, Illinois, one of three children. He became interested in Theodore Roosevelt after his grandparents took him to visit Sagamore Hill when he was 9 years old. The family moved from Illinois to Lenox, New York when Gable was 11. The following year, he wrote for the first time to Hermann Hagedorn, the head of the Theodore Roosevelt Association, and the two corresponded before meeting three years later. Gable considered Hagedorn his mentor.

After graduating from the Lenox School for Boys, Gable attended Kenyon College, where he studied medieval and American history. He was part of Psi Upsilon and was a staff member of the college newspaper, the Kenyon Collegian. Gable's senior honors thesis in 1965 was titled A nineteenth century patrician becomes a twentieth century president: an interpretation of the career of Theodore Roosevelt, 1880-1909. The culmination of his history doctorate from Brown University was a dissertation on the Bull Moose Party in 1972. He later developed this into his 1978 book The Bull Moose Years: Theodore Roosevelt and the Progressive Party.

== Career ==
After finishing graduate school, Gable was a history instructor at Brown (1972–1973), Briarcliffe College (1974–1977), and C. W. Post (1977–1989). From 1989 until 2005, he was an adjunct history professor at Hofstra University. In 1974, he joined the US Department of the Interior's Historic American Engineering Record project, which "catalog[ed] the historic engineering and commercial ventures of Long Island, Brooklyn and Queens".

In 1974, when Gable moved into the role of executive director, the Theodore Roosevelt Association (TRA) was on its last leg, having lost many of its members after the organization achieved its goal of turning Sagamore Hill into a museum. Over the course of the next 31 years, he grew membership to more than 2,000. In 1975, he founded the quarterly Theodore Roosevelt Association Journal, a peer-reviewed publication, and served as its editor until 2004. In 1978, he joined the American Museum of Natural History's Theodore Roosevelt Memorial Committee and in 1986 became part of the advisory board for the Netherlands' Roosevelt Study Center. His position and personal research made him a noted Roosevelt historian and he was a consultant and on-screen commentator for numerous television productions concerning Roosevelt, including A Man for All Times (1975), American Experience (1996), America's Castles (1996), American Presidents: Life Portraits (1999), Crucible of Empire (1999), History's Mysteries (2000), and Teddy Roosevelt: An American Lion (2003). In 2001, Roosevelt was posthumously awarded the Medal of Honor for the Spanish-American War, the culmination of a campaign led by the TRA under Gable.

Gable was a member of the Organization of American Historians, Oyster Bay Historical Society, Society for the Preservation of Long Island Antiquities, and the Center for the Study of the Presidency. He was also part of his church's vestry and a past trustee of the Oyster Bay Historical Society. The TRA awarded him with their Distinguished Service Medal shortly before his death.

== Death and legacy ==
Gable died from inoperable cancer on February 18, 2005, at what was then called North Shore University Hospital at Glen Cove. Shortly after, the Friends of Sagamore Hill, an organization Gable helped found, named its annual lecture series in his honor. Hofstra University awarded its first John Allen Gable Award in 2008.

== Selected works ==
=== Books (author) ===
- The Bull Moose Years: Theodore Roosevelt and the Progressive Party. Kennikat Press. 1978. ISBN 978-0804691871.
- "Theodore Roosevelt: A Selected and Annotated Bibliography". Theodore Roosevelt: Many-Sided American. Heart of Lakes Publishing. 1992. pp. 645–654. ISBN 978-1557870858.
- The Goodness that Doth Crown Our Days: A History of Trinity Parish. North Adams, Massachusetts, USA: Lamb Printing. 1993.
- Oyster Bay: How Firm a Foundation: The Anglican Church in Oyster Bay, New York and Colonial America. Oyster Bay: Christ Church. 2004.
- Purcell, L. Edward (2010). "Theodore Roosevelt (1858-1919)". Vice Presidents: A Biographical Dictionary. Infobase Publishing. pp. 251–252. ISBN 9781438130712.

=== Books (editor) ===
- The Man in the Arena. Speeches and Essays By Theodore Roosevelt. Theodore Roosevelt Association. 1990.
- Theodore Roosevelt: Many-Sided American. Heart of Lakes Publishing. 1992. ISBN 978-1557870858. With Natalie A. Naylor and Douglas Brinkley.
