= George B. Sohier Prize =

- Awarded for: Best thesis by a student of English or Modern Literature
- Country: United States
- Presented by: Harvard University
- First award: 1890
- Website: http://isites.harvard.edu/icb/icb.do?keyword=k4326&pageid=icb.page50285

The George B. Sohier Prize, established by Bostonian businessman Waldo Higginson in 1890, is a $250 annual award for the best thesis of approximately 10,000 words or text submitted by a student of English or Modern Literature at Harvard University or Radcliffe College. Resident graduate students attending Harvard Graduate School of Arts and Sciences are also eligible for the prize. Higginson's $6,500 grant, later increased to $7,000, was given with the stipulation that the prize money would be drawn from its annual interest and that any surplus would go toward Harvard University Library for the purchase of books. It was also understood that the annual prize would not be awarded if the Harvard Faculty of Arts and Sciences deemed there were no suitable entries for that year. Waldo Higginson (1814–1894) graduated from Harvard in 1833 and had given the grant to honor his brother-in-law, George Brimmer Sohier (1832–1877), an 1852 Harvard graduate.

== Early recipients ==
Year	Prize Winner	Thesis
1890	Curtis Hidden Page	The Influence of Diderot on German Literature
1891	Raymond Calkins	Criticism During the Classical Periods of German Literature.
1892*	John Corbin	The Elizabethan Hamlet
1892*	William Tenney Brewster	The Rise and Influence of Reviews
1893		
1894	William Vaughn Moody	Sidney's Arcadia and Its Sources
1895		
1896	Carleton Eldredge Noyes	Joseph and Thomas Warton and in their relationship to the English Romantic Movement
1897	Beulah Marie Dix	Published Collections of English and Scottish Ballads, 1765–1802."
1898		
1899
1900	Henry Latimer Seaver	The Shepherd’s Calendar and Its Sources
1901	Charles M. Underwood	A Comparison between the Critical Methods of Sainte Beuve and Taine
1902		
1903	Ernest Bernbaum	Elizabethan Domestic Dramas
1904	Frances Elizabeth Newell	Geoffrey of Monmouth and the Sabrina Legend
1905	Walter Ralston Nelles	The Dramatic Works of Henry Fielding
1906	Homer Howells Harbour	The Influence of Keats on English Poetry of the nineteenth Century
1907*	Hermann Hagedorn Jr.	The Plays of the English Comedians in Germany, and the Reasons underlying the Mutilation of the Elizabethan Originals
1908		
1909	Louise Anne Hannon	Lord Chesterfield, A Study of the Survival in the 18th century of the Aristocratic Ideal\
1910	Norman Otto Foerster	Henry David Thoreau: Poet
1911	Benjamin Harrison Lehman	
1912		
1913		
1914*	Delight Walkly Hall	
1914*	Elizabeth Jackson	
1915	Harold Gersham Files,	
1916	Helen Constance White	
1917*	Harold Shepherd Bennett	Comparison of the Lyric Poetry of Mörike and Heine with Reference to the Principles of Lessing’s Laocoön”
1917*	Waldo Cutler Peeble	Swedenborg's Influence on Goethe”
1918	Martin Luther Hope,	Thomas Hardy”
1919		
1920	Stephen Albert Freeman	A Comparative Study of Aeschylus and Corneille
		* Prize Shared By Dual Winners
