= Electoral history of Theodore Roosevelt =

Elections featuring President of the US

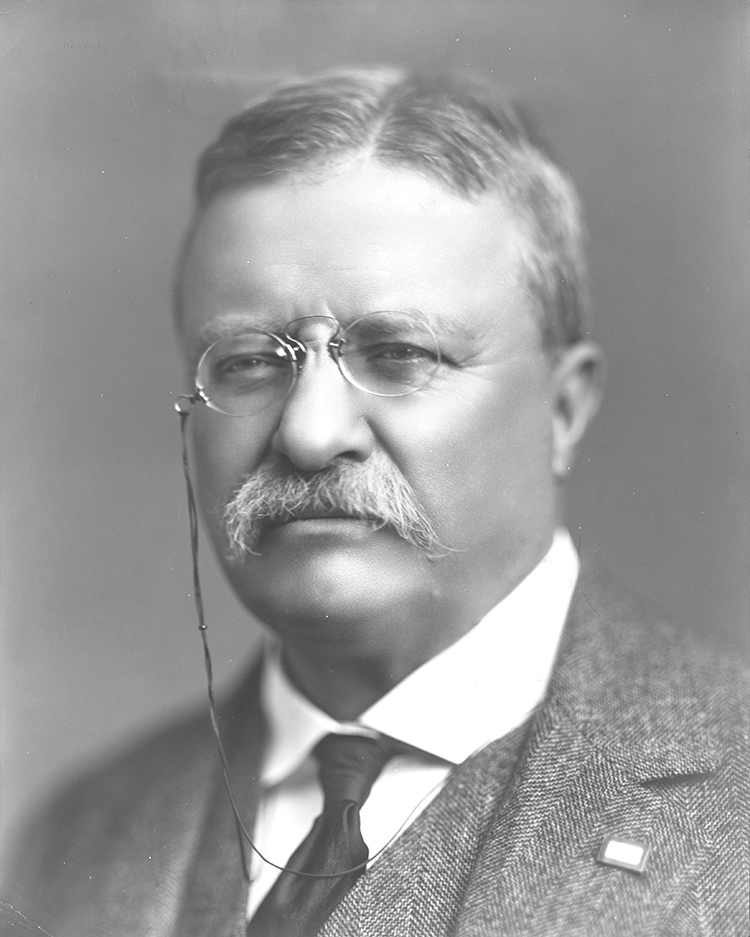
Theodore Roosevelt in 1918

Theodore Roosevelt served as the 26th president of the United States (1901–1909), the 25th vice president (1901), and the 33rd governor of New York (1899–1900).

== 1881 New York state election ==
Theodore Roosevelt won election to New York's 21st district as assemblyman, his first political office. The election win was engineered by who he later credited in his autobiography as his "discoverer", Joseph Murray.

== 1886 New York City mayoral election ==
1886 New York City mayoral election
Party	Candidate	Votes	%
Democratic	Abram Hewitt	90,552	41.23
Labor	Henry George	68,110	31.01
Republican	Theodore Roosevelt	60,435	27.52
Prohibition	William T. Wardwell	532	0.24 %
Democratic gain from Nonpartisan			

== 1898 New York gubernatorial election ==
- Theodore Roosevelt/Timothy L. Woodruff (R) - 661,715 (49.09%)
- Augustus Van Wyck/Elliott Danforth (D) - 643,921 (47.77%)
- Benjamin Hanford (Socialist) - 23,860 (1.77%)
- John Kline (Prohibition) - 18,383 (1.36%)

== United States presidential election ==
=== 1900 ===
1900 Republican National Convention (vice presidential tally):

- Theodore Roosevelt - 925 (99.89%)
- Abstaining - 1 (0.11%)

1900 United States presidential election:

- William McKinley/Theodore Roosevelt (R) - 7,228,864 (51.6%) and 292 electoral votes (65.32%, 28 states carried)
- William Jennings Bryan/Adlai E. Stevenson I (D) - 6,370,932 (45.5%) and 155 electoral votes (34.68%, 17 states carried)
- John Granville Woolley/Henry Brewer Metcalf (Prohibition) - 210,864 (1.5%)
- Eugene V. Debs/Job Harriman (Socialist) - 87,945 (0.6%)
- Wharton Barker/Ignatius L. Donnelly (Populist) - 50,989 (0.4%)
- Joseph Francis Maloney/Valentine Remmel (Socialist Labor) - 40,943 (0.3%)
- Others - 6,889 (0.0%)

=== 1904–1916 ===
1904 Republican National Convention (presidential tally)

- Theodore Roosevelt (inc.) - 994 (100.00%)

1904 United States presidential election:

- Theodore Roosevelt/Charles W. Fairbanks (R) - 7,630,457 (56.4%) and 336 electoral votes (70.59%, 32 states carried)
- Alton B. Parker/Henry G. Davis (D) - 5,083,880 (37.6%) and 140 electoral votes (29.41%, 13 states carried)
- Eugene V. Debs/Benjamin Hanford (Socialist) - 402,810 (3.0%)
- Silas C. Swallow/George W. Carroll (Prohibition) - 259,102 (1.9%)
- Thomas E. Watson/Thomas Tibbles (Populist) - 114,070 (0.8%)
- Charles Hunter Corregan/William Wesley Cox (Socialist Labor) - 33,454 (0.2%)
- Others - 1,229 (0.0%)

1908 Republican National Convention (Presidential tally):

- William Howard Taft - 702 (71.63%)
- Philander C. Knox - 68 (6.94%)
- Charles Evans Hughes - 67 (6.84%)
- Joseph Gurney Cannon - 58 (5.92%)
- Charles W. Fairbanks - 40 (4.08%)
- Robert M. La Follette, Sr. - 25 (2.55%)
- Joseph B. Foraker - 16 (1.63%)
- Theodore Roosevelt (inc.) - 3 (0.31%)
- Abstaining - 1 (0.10%)

1911 New York Republican Senate caucus:

- Chauncey M. DePew (inc.) - 58 (87.88%)
- E. H. Butler - 2 (3.03%)
- Theodore Roosevelt - 2 (3.03%)
- L. A. Grace - 1 (1.52%)
- Seth Low - 1 (1.52%)
- George L. Meade - 1 (1.52%)
- Andrew D. White - 1 (1.52%)

1912 Republican presidential primaries:

- Theodore Roosevelt - 1,183,238 (51.14%)
- William Howard Taft (inc.) - 800,441 (34.59%)
- Robert M. La Follette, Sr. - 327,357 (14.15%)
- Robert G. Ross - 605 (0.03%)
- Charles Evans Hughes - 13 (0.00%)
- Others - 2,193 (0.10%)

1912 Republican National Convention (Presidential tally):

- William Howard Taft (inc.) - 556 (51.58%)
- Abstaining - 355 (32.93%)
- Theodore Roosevelt - 107 (9.93%)
- Robert M. La Follette, Sr. - 41 (3.80%)
- Albert B. Cummins - 17 (1.58%)
- Charles Evans Hughes - 2 (0.19%)

1912 Progressive National Convention:

- Theodore Roosevelt - unanimously

1912 United States presidential election:

- Woodrow Wilson/Thomas R. Marshall (D) - 6,296,284 (41.8%) and 435 electoral votes (81.92%, 40 states carried)
- Theodore Roosevelt/Hiram W. Johnson (Progressive) - 4,122,721 (27.4%) and 88 electoral votes (16.57%, 6 states carried)
- William Howard Taft/Nicholas M. Butler (R) - 3,486,242 (23.2%) and 8 electoral votes (1.51%, 2 states carried)
- Eugene V. Debs/Emil Seidel (Socialist) - 901,551 (6.0%)
- Eugene Wilder Chafin/Aaron Sherman Watkins (Prohibition) - 208,156 (1.4%)
- Arthur Elmer Reimer/August Gilhaus (Socialist Labor) - 29,324 (0.2%)
- Others - 4,556 (0.0%)

1916 Progressive presidential primaries:

- Theodore Roosevelt - 5,152 (71.12%)
- Charles Evans Hughes - 10 (0.14%)
- Lawrence Sherman - 10 (0.14%)
- Others - 2,072 (28.60%)

1916 Republican presidential primaries:

- Unpledged delegates - 455,765 (23.60%)
- Martin G. Brumbaugh - 233,100 (12.07%)
- Albert B. Cummins - 191,951 (9.94%)
- Charles W. Fairbanks - 176,080 (9.12%)
- Lawrence Sherman - 155,945 (8.07%)
- Robert M. La Follette, Sr. - 133,476 (6.91%)
- Henry Ford - 131,965 (6.83%)
- Theodore Elijah Burton - 122,169 (6.33%)
- Theodore Roosevelt - 83,739 (4.34%)
- Charles Evans Hughes - 82,530 (4.27%)
- William Alden Smith - 77,872 (4.03%)
- Henry D. Estabrook - 30,676 (1.59%)
- William Grant Webster - 17,927 (0.93%)
- William O. Simpson - 14,365 (0.74%)

1916 Progressive National Convention:

- Theodore Roosevelt - unanimously

1916 Republican National Convention:

1st ballot:

- Charles Evans Hughes - 253.5
- John W. Weeks - 105
- Elihu Root - 103
- Albert B. Cummins - 85
- Charles W. Fairbanks - 74.5
- Theodore E. Burton - 77.5
- Theodore Roosevelt - 65
- Philander C. Knox - 36
- Henry Ford - 32
- Martin G. Brumbaugh - 29
- Robert M. La Follette - 25
- Others - 25

2nd ballot:

- Charles Evans Hughes - 328.5
- Elihu Root - 98.5
- Charles W. Fairbanks - 88.5
- Albert W. Cummins - 85
- Theodore Roosevelt - 81
- John W. Weeks - 79
- Theodore E. Burton - 76.5
- Philander C. Knox - 36
- Robert M. La Follette, Sr. - 25
- Others - 13

3rd ballot:

- Charles Evans Hughes - 949.5
- Theodore Roosevelt - 18.5
- Robert M. La Follette, Sr. - 3
- John W. Weeks - 3
- Others - 13
