= Theodore Roosevelt Memorial Park =

Park in the hamlet of Oyster Bay, New York

Coordinates: 40°52′31.6″N 73°31′56.62″W

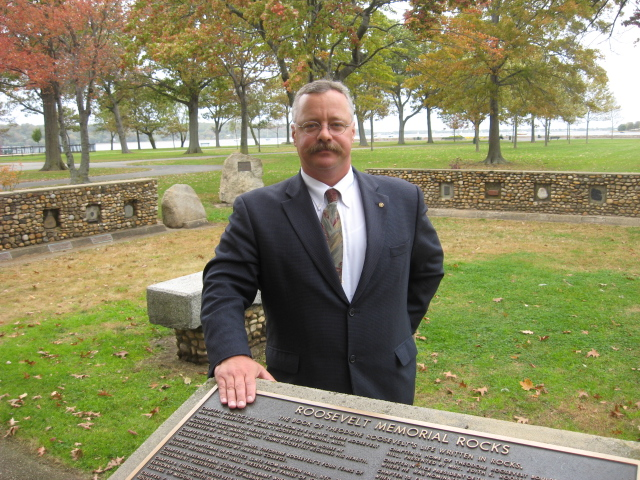
Theodore Roosevelt re-enactor Joe Wiegand beside the Theodore Roosevelt Monument Assemblage in Theodore Roosevelt Memorial Park

Theodore Roosevelt Memorial Park is a waterfront public park in Oyster Bay, New York, created to honor Theodore Roosevelt, the 26th president of the United States. The park occupies land that was historically a salt marsh and later became a dumping ground with shacks and industrial activity near the Oyster Bay railroad station. In the years after Roosevelt’s death, the Roosevelt Memorial Association formed to commemorate his legacy and pursue several memorial projects. The association worked on creating the park and dedicated it in May 1928 at a large public ceremony. In 1942, the Theodore Roosevelt Association donated the park to the Town of Oyster Bay.

The park is arranged around a memorial-focused eastern section and a more active western section. The west side includes tennis courts, a softball field, a children’s play area, and parking. The east side features geometric pathways leading to a waterfront plaza and flagpole, along with several Roosevelt-related memorial elements, including an entrance plaque and the Theodore Roosevelt Monument Assemblage.

== History ==
Land that the Theodore Roosevelt Memorial Park presently occupies used to be one of the most unsightly spots in the village, a marshy dumping ground dotted with rundown shacks. For several hundred years, the salt marsh had been used for grazing cattle, but by the end of the 19th century, squatters had begun to live on the land.

Rail passengers arriving to the newly built Oyster Bay Railroad Station got a birds-eye view of refuse and derelict shanties. One of those passengers was Theodore Roosevelt, a frequent commuter on the Long Island Railroad when he served as President of the New York City Board of Police Commissioners. Though at the time he had no idea that this would become be a waterfront park dedicated in his name, T. R. once said "I wish that we citizens of Oyster Bay could make here a breathing place for all the people of this neighborhood, especially the less fortunate ones."

A non-partisan "Roosevelt Permanent Memorial National Committee" was formed on January 10, 1919, just days after Roosevelt's death on January 6. The committee met again in New York City on March 24, 1919, and founded the Roosevelt Memorial Association, which was incorporated by Act of Congress, May 31, 1920, "to perpetuate the memory of Theodore Roosevelt for the benefit of the people of the United States of America and the world."

The Roosevelt Memorial Association had written into its charter three primary goals: to establish a "monumental memorial" to TR in the nation's capital, Washington, D.C.; to develop a public park in Oyster Bay, New York; and to raise funds for and maintain an association "to promote the development and application of the policies and ideals of Theodore Roosevelt for the benefit of the American people."

The second goal to form a public park in Oyster bay helped to bring about a merger of a local Long Island group that was formed to honor Roosevelt with the national association. The job of purchasing the lands needed took many long years. The Townsend family quickly sold a parcel of their land for the project at a reasonable price, but another large section was much harder to acquire. Suddenly, the worthless marsh was a valuable commodity. During the six-year-long quest to reach an agreement with the landowner, the Town decided to officially use it as the Town Dump.

After all, they reasoned, they would have to fill in the land with something; and the town’s garbage had to be put somewhere as well. In 1925, a judge settled the legal issues and the Town was able to purchase the additional parklands and proceed with the transformation from dump to manicured park.

The shacks were removed, the Oyster Bay Lumber Company, whose operations were on the site, was relocated, and the mammoth job of straightening the shoreline, grading the land, and building the seawall began.

Finally in May 1928 a dedication ceremony for the new Theodore Roosevelt Memorial Park was held, attended by over 5,000 people, complete with a parade and a fly-over by planes, which dropped bouquets of flowers at the waters edge.

Later in 1942, the park was donated by the Theodore Roosevelt Association to the Town of Oyster Bay.

== Park layout and configuration ==
The park was originally designed along an east and west, and a north and south axis. The west side of the park became used for physical activities and presently contains tennis courts, a softball field, children's play area, and large parking lot.

The east side consists of radiating pathways in a geometric pattern leading from the park entrance on Railroad Avenue northwards to the water where a large flagpole stands in a plaza area. This and the area immediately to the west is known as Zone "B" - designated for memorial purposes and quiet recreational activities.

Among the memorials present are a stone with plaque honoring TR at the park entrance, a Theodore Roosevelt Monument Assemblage with stones and artifacts drawn from important times of Roosevelt's life and highlighting his service to New York City, the State of New York, the United States, and the world. A fountain is adjacent to the Theodore Roosevelt Monument Assemblage with water flowing in two directions from a central raised rectangular sculptural section.

Just east of these two memorials is a marina. A parking lot and picnic area with several pavilions is located immediately south of the marina and north of the railroad tracks nearby.

== See also ==
- Oyster Bay History Walk
- List of Town of Oyster Bay Landmarks
- National Register of Historic Places listings in Nassau County, New York
