= Morton Hall (New York City) =

Former Republican clubhouse in Manhattan, New York City

General information
- Type: Political clubhouse
- Location: New York City, New York, U.S., 8 East 59th Street
- Coordinates: 40.7639°N 73.9726°W

Morton Hall was a prominent late-19th-century political clubhouse located at on 59th Street in New York City. It served as the official headquarters for the Twenty-First Assembly District Republican Association, a localized faction of the Republican Party during the Gilded Age. The hall is historically significant as the venue where future U.S. president Theodore Roosevelt entered public life and secured his first political nomination in 1881.

== Description ==
Morton Hall was located on the south side of 59th Street between Fifth and Madison avenues. In his 1913 autobiography, Theodore Roosevelt described Morton Hall as "a large, barn-like room over a saloon". The interior featured standard political clubhouse decor of the era, which Roosevelt noted consisted of "dingy benches, spittoons, a dais at one end with a table and chair, and a stout pitcher for iced water". The walls were adorned with portraits of prominent Republican figures, including Civil War General and President Ulysses S. Grant and Levi P. Morton, the prominent New York politician after whom the hall was named.

The clubhouse operated as a local hub for political organizing, mapping out voting drives, and enforcing party loyalty in Manhattan's 21st district.

== Historical significance ==
=== Theodore Roosevelt's "Baptism in Politics" ===
Following his graduation from Harvard and a brief stint at Columbia Law School, a 23-year-old Theodore Roosevelt sought out the local Republican political organization at Morton Hall to enter civic life. The club was largely populated by working-class party operatives, local tradesmen, and ward politicians who initially viewed the wealthy, aristocratic Roosevelt as an eccentric "silk-stocking" outsider.

Despite resistance from established party bosses, Roosevelt found an ally in Joseph "Joe" Murray, an influential, reform-minded Irish-American political operative within the machine. Murray was looking for a fresh candidate to outmaneuver the entrenched district leadership and build a coalition of working-class and elite voters. On October 28, 1881, during a convention held inside Morton Hall, Murray engineered a tactical coup against the district boss by nominating Roosevelt for the New York State Assembly. Roosevelt won the nomination on the first ballot and went on to win the general election that November, launching his political career. Roosevelt famously later referred to Murray as the man who "started me in politics".

=== Political Enforcement ===
Morton Hall was also a site for strict party discipline. In December 1880, the Twenty-First Assembly District Republican Association used the hall to hold high-profile meetings resulting in the expulsion of members who broke ranks to vote against machine-endorsed candidates, such as local party figure Jacob Hess.

== Legacy ==
The physical hall no longer exists, but its role in American political history is commemorated as Roosevelt's "baptismal in politics".

In 1924, a historic monument known as the Theodore Roosevelt Monument Assemblage was constructed in Oyster Bay, New York. The monument chronicles Roosevelt's life via a series of rocks and relics from geographically significant periods of his career. "Chapter 4" of the monument is represented by a physical piece of historic slate taken from Morton Hall, which was presented by the family of Joe Murray to honor the site where Roosevelt's path to the presidency began.

== See also ==
- Theodore Roosevelt
- Tammany Hall
- History of New York City (1855–1897)
