= The Buffalo News =

Newspaper in Buffalo, New York, US

- Type: Newspaper
- Format: Broadsheet
- Owner(s): Lee Enterprises (2020–present) Berkshire Hathaway (1977–2020) Butler family (1873–1977)
- Editor: Margaret Kenny Giancola
- Founded: October 11, 1880; 145 years ago as the Buffalo Evening News
- Headquarters: Buffalo
- Circulation: 23,735 Daily; 67,430 Digital (as of June 1, 2025)
- ISSN: 0745-2691
- OCLC number: 8882862
- Website: buffalonews.com

The Buffalo News is the main newspaper of the Buffalo–Niagara Falls metropolitan area, located in downtown Buffalo, New York.

It was for decades the only paper fully owned by Warren Buffett's Berkshire Hathaway. In 2020, the paper was sold to Lee Enterprises.

== History ==
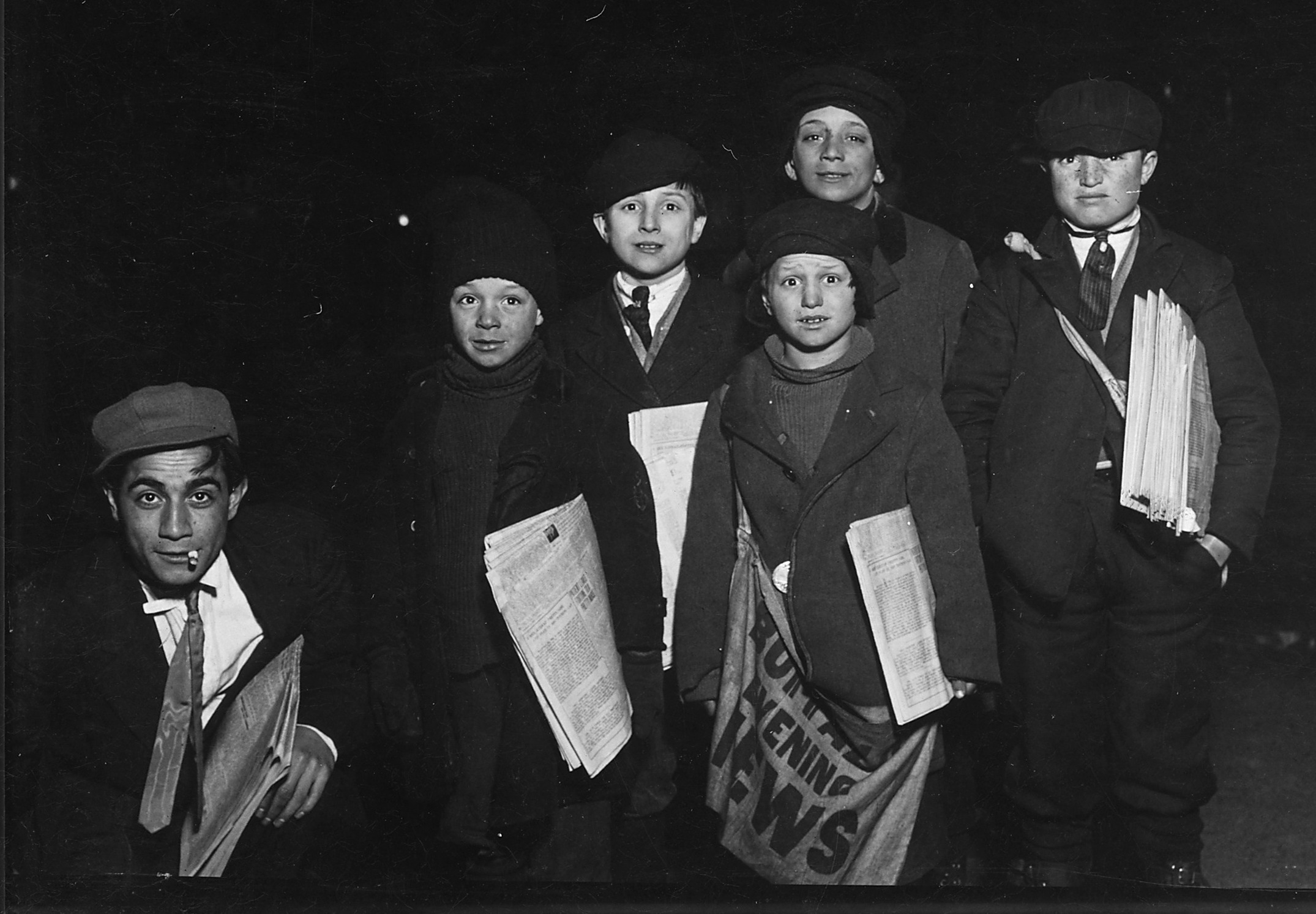
Buffalo Evening News paper boys in February 1910

Logo in 2003

The Buffalo News was founded as a Sunday paper with the name The Buffalo Sunday Morning News in 1873 by Edward Hubert Butler, Sr. On October 11, 1880, it began publishing daily editions as well, and in 1914, it became an inversion of its original existence by publishing Monday to Saturday, with no publication on Sunday. During most of its life, the News was known as The Buffalo Evening News. A gentleman's agreement between the Evening News and the Buffalo Courier-Express meant that the Evening News would be evening-only, and the Courier-Express would be morning-only. Until 1977, the News did not publish on Sundays because of the agreement, and its weekend edition appeared on Saturday evening.

The Butler family owned the Evening News until 1974, when longtime owner and publisher Katherine Butler, granddaughter of the founder, died and left no heirs. The Evening News properties were placed in a blind trust, which sold the Evening News to Berkshire Hathaway in 1977. The new owners began publishing on Saturday and Sunday mornings. After a period of financial decline, the Courier-Express published its last issue on September 19, 1982. The Evening News then shortened its name to The Buffalo News and became an all-day newspaper, publishing two editions seven days a week.

On October 1, 2006, the News announced it would abandon its evening edition later that month.

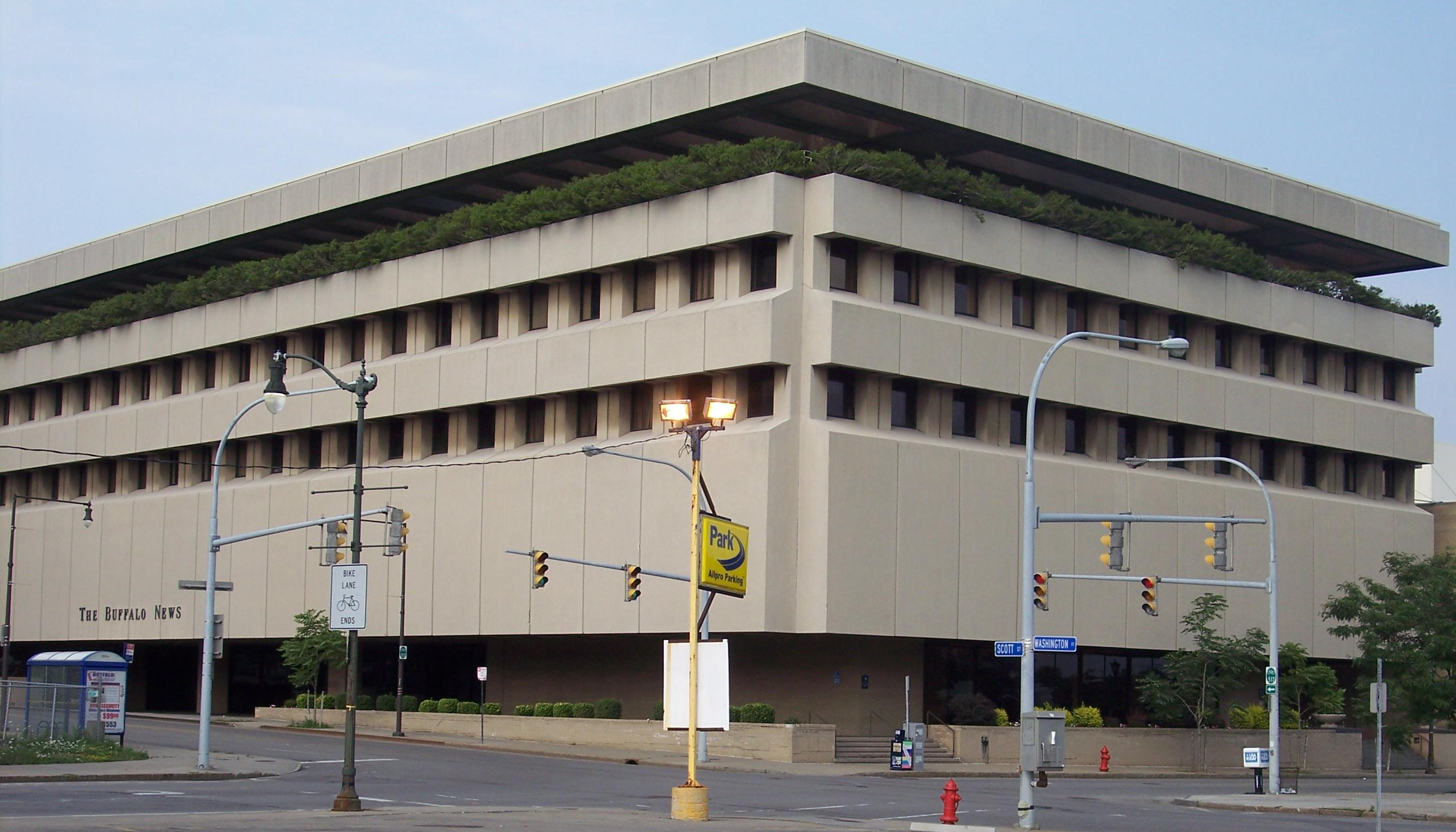
Buffalo News building (2011)

The Buffalo News had published three morning editions (Western New York, Final and Niagara) that appeared online at BuffaloNews.com, reaching over 400,000 readers, across eight counties each day. These separate editions were eliminated in 2018 and consolidated into a single Final edition, in response to a newsprint shortage.

The newspaper founded and owned the WBEN television and radio stations, which are now WIVB (Channel 4), WBEN (930), WYRK (106.5) and WBKV (102.5), respectively. The radio stations are now owned by other companies, but in 2014, WIVB came back under partial co-ownership with the News when Buffett's Media General merged with the WIVB parent company, LIN Media.

On January 29, 2020, the News reported it was being sold along – with the rest of Berkshire Hathaway's newspaper portfolio – to Lee Enterprises, an Iowa-based owner of 50 newspapers that has had significant ties to Berkshire Hathaway since 2012 and had operated Berkshire Hathaway's other newspapers since 2018. In September 2024, ten jobs were eliminated from the newsroom which has an estimated 55 positions.

On November 3, 2025, the News moved to a six day print schedule, eliminating its Monday print edition.

== Pulitzer Prizes ==
Journalists for The Buffalo News and The Buffalo Evening News have won four Pulitzer Prizes:

- In 1958, Bruce Shanks received the Pulitzer Prize for Editorial Cartooning for his August 10, 1957 piece, "The Thinker", detailing union corruption.
- In 1961, Edgar May received the Pulitzer Prize for Local Reporting for his series, "Our Costly Dilemma," concerning the need for reform of New York State's welfare system. The series touched off debates about welfare reform nationwide.
- In 1990, Tom Toles brought the News its second Editorial Cartooning award, for his work throughout the year (although his piece "First Amendment" has been cited as the work that merited the award).
- In 2015, Adam Zyglis won the Pulitzer Prize for Editorial Cartooning for using, in the committee's citation, "strong images to connect with readers while conveying layers of meaning in few words".

News journalists have been finalists for four other Pulitzer Prizes, but did not win:

- Toles (1985 and 1996, for Editorial Cartooning) and,
- James Heaney (1993, for Investigative Reporting) and,
- Staff (2015, for Breaking News Reporting).

== Publishers and editors ==
Publishers

- Edward Hubert Butler, Sr., 1880–1914: also founder
- Edward Hubert Butler Jr., 1914–1956: son of Butler Sr
- James H. Righter, 1956–1971
- Kate M. Robinson Butler, 1971–1974: wife of Butler Jr
- Henry Z. Urban, 1974–1983
- Stanford Lipsey, 1983–2013
- Warren T. Colville, 2013–2020
- Tom Wiley, 2020–2025
- Sean Jacobsen, 2026–present

Editors

- Alfred H. Kirchhofer, 1956–1966
- Paul E. Neville, 1966–1969
- Murray B. Light, 1979–1999
- Margaret M. Sullivan, 1999—2012
- Michael K. Connelly, 2012–2022
- Sheila Rayam, 2022–2024
- Margaret Kenny Giancola, 2024–present
