= John Corbin =

American novelist

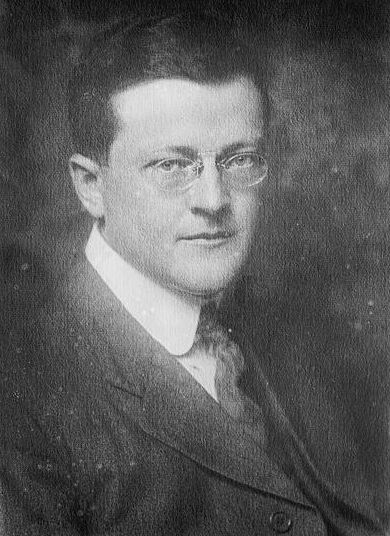
John Corbin

John Corbin (May 2, 1870 – August 30, 1959) was an American dramatic critic and author.

== Career overview ==
John Corbin was born in Chicago and educated at Harvard, where he was awarded the George B. Sohier Prize for literature. After his graduation from Harvard, Corbin soon became an established writer in New York City. From 1897 to 1900 he was an assistant editor of Harper's Magazine, during part of this time acting also as dramatic critic for Harper's Weekly; in 1902 he wrote the dramatic notices of The New York Times and in 1905-07 those of the Sun. From 1908 to 1910 he was literary manager of The New Theatre, during the short life of which his efforts contributed much towards notably artistic productions. He served as secretary of the Drama Society of New York until 1916. In 1916 he produced Shakespeare's The Tempest (with full text in the Elizabethan manner). From 1917 to 1919 he was dramatic critic of The New York Times and after 1919 editorial writer for the same paper.

== Works ==
- (1895). The Elizabethan Hamlet, Charles Scribner's Sons.
- (1898). Schoolboy Life in England: An American View, Harper & Brothers.
- (1902). An American at University of Oxford, Houghton, Mifflin and Company.
- (1903). A New Portrait of Shakespeare, John Lane: The Bodley Head.
- (1903). The First Loves of Perilla, Fox, Duffield and Company.
- (1907). The Cave Man, D. Appleton and Company.
- (1908). Which College for the Boy, Houghton, Mifflin and Company.
- (1910). Husband and The Forbidden Guests, Houghton, Mifflin and Company.
- (1915). The Edge, Duffield and Company.
- (1922). The Return of the Middle Class, Charles Scribner's Sons.
- (1930). The Unknown Washington, Charles Scribner's Sons.
- (1940). Two Frontiers of Freedom, Charles Scribner's Sons.

=== Articles ===
- "The Training of the Harvard Intercollegiate Team in 1891," Outing, Vol. XX, April/September 1892.
- "A Moot Point in Track Athletics," Outing, Vol. XXI, October 1892/March 1893.
- "The German Hamlet and the Earlier English Versions," Harvard Studies and Notes in Philology and Literature, Vol. V, 1896.
- "English and American University Athletics," Outing, Vol. XXXIX, October 1901/March 1902.
- "English and American Rugby," Outing, Vol. XXXIX, October 1901/March 1902.
- "The Latim Quarter of England," The Lamp, Vol. XXVI, February/July 1903.
- "Plays that don't get Played," The World's Work, Vol. XX, May/October 1910.
- "Shakspere his Own Stage-Manager," The Century, Vol. LXXXIII, November 1911/April 1912.
- "A Review of Revues," The New York Times, January 27, 1918.
- "Democracy and Womanwood," Scribner's Magazine, Vol. LXXII, July/December 1922.

=== Short stories ===
- "A Christman Ascent of Mount Adams," Outing, Vol. XIX, October 1891/March 1892.
- "The Vital Impulse," The Century, Vol. LXXV, November 1907/April 1908.
- "Boosting Myrtle," The Century, Vol. LXXV, November 1907/April 1908.
- "The Elephant's Bride," The Century, Vol. LXXVI, May/October 1908.

=== Other ===
- "The Tyranny of Police and Press," Introduction to The Author's Apology, by Bernard Shaw. New York, Brentano's, 1905.
