= Curtis Hidden Page =

American politician

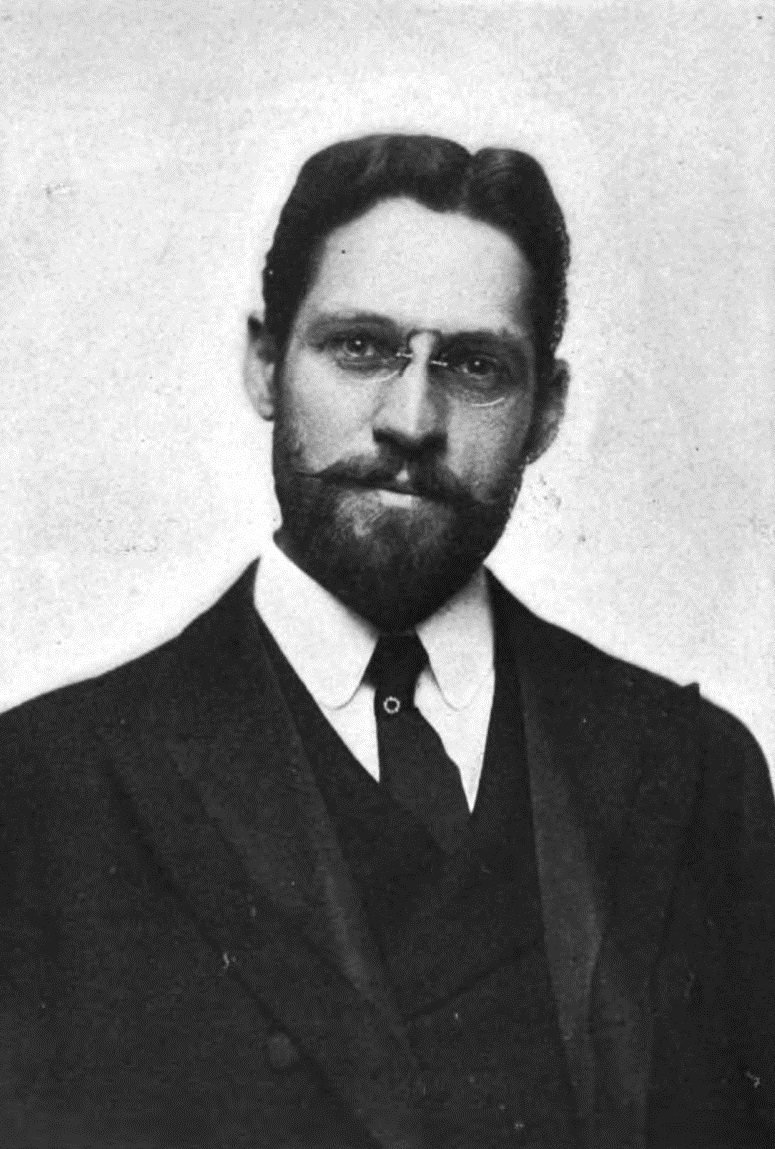
Curtis Hidden Page

Curtis Hidden Page (April 4, 1870 – December 12, 1946) was a United States educator and writer.

== Biography ==
Curtis Hidden Page was born in Greenwood, Missouri. He graduated from Harvard University, where in 1890 he became the first recipient of the George B. Sohier Prize for literature. He held teaching positions in French and English at Harvard University (1893–1908), Columbia University (1908–1909), Northwestern University (professor of English literature, 1909–1911), and Dartmouth College (professor of English literature, 1911–1946).

Page was elected to the New Hampshire state legislature in 1933 and again in 1939.

Compiler of anthologies of verse such as British Poets of the Nineteenth Century and The Chief American Poets, Page also published verses, essays, and stories in numerous periodicals. In 1906, writing of his activities to his fellow Harvard alumni, he stated: "I have two volumes of verse nearly ready, but find little time to give to completing them and doubt if they will be published until after I am dead!"

Page also translated many French works, including A Voyage to the Moon, by Cyrano de Bergerac and The Man Who Married a Dumb Wife by Anatole France. He published a well-regarded translation of eight plays by Molière in 1908; of these, Tartuffe, or the Hypocrite is available online from Project Gutenberg.

He died in Laconia, New Hampshire on December 12, 1946.
