= Isthmian Canal Commission =

American administrator of the Panama Canal Zone

The Isthmian Canal Commission (often known as the ICC) was an American administration commission set up to oversee the construction of the Panama Canal in the early years of American involvement. Established on February 26, 1904, it was given control of the Panama Canal Zone over which the United States exercised sovereignty. The commission reported directly to Secretary of War William Taft.

It was initially composed of seven members, appointed by President Theodore Roosevelt, directed to avoid the inefficiency and corruption that had plagued the French 15 years earlier. On May 6, 1904, President Theodore Roosevelt appointed John Findley Wallace, formerly chief engineer and finally general manager of the Illinois Central Railroad, chief engineer of the Panama Canal project. Wallace was paid a $25,000 annual salary, the highest of any government employee at that time other than the president. In addition to the engineering and worker health problems, Wallace faced many bureaucratic challenges from the ICC, which had to approve essentially every significant decision Wallace made in the Canal Zone. With engineers filling out more than 1,000 work request forms weekly, even the simplest tasks often took months to complete. In addition to "make dirt fly", as directed by Roosevelt, Wallace was forced to use the often dilapidated infrastructure and equipment left behind by the French when they sold their concession.

The ICC was later reduced to three members on the recommendation of John Findley Wallace, the chief engineer. Overwhelmed, Wallace resigned abruptly in June 1905. In 1906 when a new chief engineer, John Frank Stevens, was appointed, he was not a member of the commission. He increasingly viewed the bureaucratic ICC as a serious hindrance and ended up bypassing the commission and sending requests and demands directly to the Roosevelt Administration in Washington.

The following year (1905) in Washington, D.C., Joseph Bucklin Bishop, an associate of Theodore Roosevelt and a strong editorial advocate for U.S. participation in the canal project, was appointed Executive Secretary of the Isthmian Canal Commission along with a new chairman, Theodore P. Shonts. Bishop was tasked with managing the commission's day-to-day matters, but also with ensuring public support for the canal through public relations and by keeping the project's official history. Bishop's promised $10,000 annual salary was relentlessly criticized by Roosevelt's opponents in Congress, mostly because it was twice what each of them made. Opposition newspapers joined in the criticism. In the summer of 1907, when escalating allegations of cronyism surrounding Bishop's appointment threatened appropriations for Panama Canal construction, Taft, surely with Roosevelt's quiet assent, ordered Bishop out of Washington to Panama, where the partisan political heat would be less intense. "I accept your decision without reluctance," Bishop informed Taft, "and shall go to the Isthmus, not sadly but cheerfully." It would not be his first trip to Panama. In the fall of the previous year, Bishop had gone ahead to advance Roosevelt's historic inspection tour, the first time a sitting president had journeyed outside the United States.

In 1907, the Isthmian Canal Commission hired photographer Ernest "Red" Hallen to photograph the progress of the canal, in order to satisfy both Washington and the American public. Hallen would go on to document the entirety of the Canal's construction and everyday life for the following 30 years. A major factor in the successful construction of the canal was the work of Army doctors William C. Gorgas and Robert Ernest Noble to identify mosquitoes as the carriers of diseases including yellow fever and malaria, then develop eradication campaigns for the mosquitoes and treatments for the diseases.

Joseph Bucklin Bishop would, except for month-long summer breaks, remain on the isthmus for seven years, serving clandestinely at first as Theodore Roosevelt's "eyes and ears". He reported back on the "astonishing" progress that Army Corps of Engineers Colonel George Washington Goethals and his team were making excavating the "big ditch", building dams and locks. Before long, Bishop became Goethals's trusted aide, serving as his first line of defense against workers with complaints and grievances. But Bishop's greatest achievement in Panama would be as founding editor of The Canal Record, a weekly newspaper for the thousands of workers in Panama. His regular reports of the cubic yards dug by rival work divisions, and the competitive baseball games they played, created a spirit of healthy competition that lifted worker morale and productivity. The "good news" of The Canal Record also built vital public support on newspaper editorial pages back home and in the halls of the United States Congress, where annual appropriations were required to keep the canal project moving forward.
