= Edward Hubert Butler Jr. =

American publisher and editor

Edward Hubert Butler II (June 19, 1883 – February 19, 1956) was an American publisher and editor of The Buffalo Evening News (1914–1956) and president of radio station WBEN (1930–1956) and WBEN-TV (1948–1956).

== Biography ==
He was born on June 19, 1883, to Edward Hubert Butler Sr. in Buffalo, New York.

He attended Nichols and Hill School in Pottstown, Pennsylvania, and graduated from Yale University in 1907.

Butler married Kate M. Robinson (1885–1974) in 1909 and had two children, Edward Hubert Butler III (1915–1919) and Kate Robinson Wallis (m. 1921 Bruce E. Wallis).

Butler assumed the ownership of the Evening News and the family mansion upon the death of his father in 1914.

He died on February 19, 1956.

== Legacy ==
His wife Kate was publisher from 1971 until her death in 1974.
