= Joseph Bucklin Bishop =

American newspaper editor

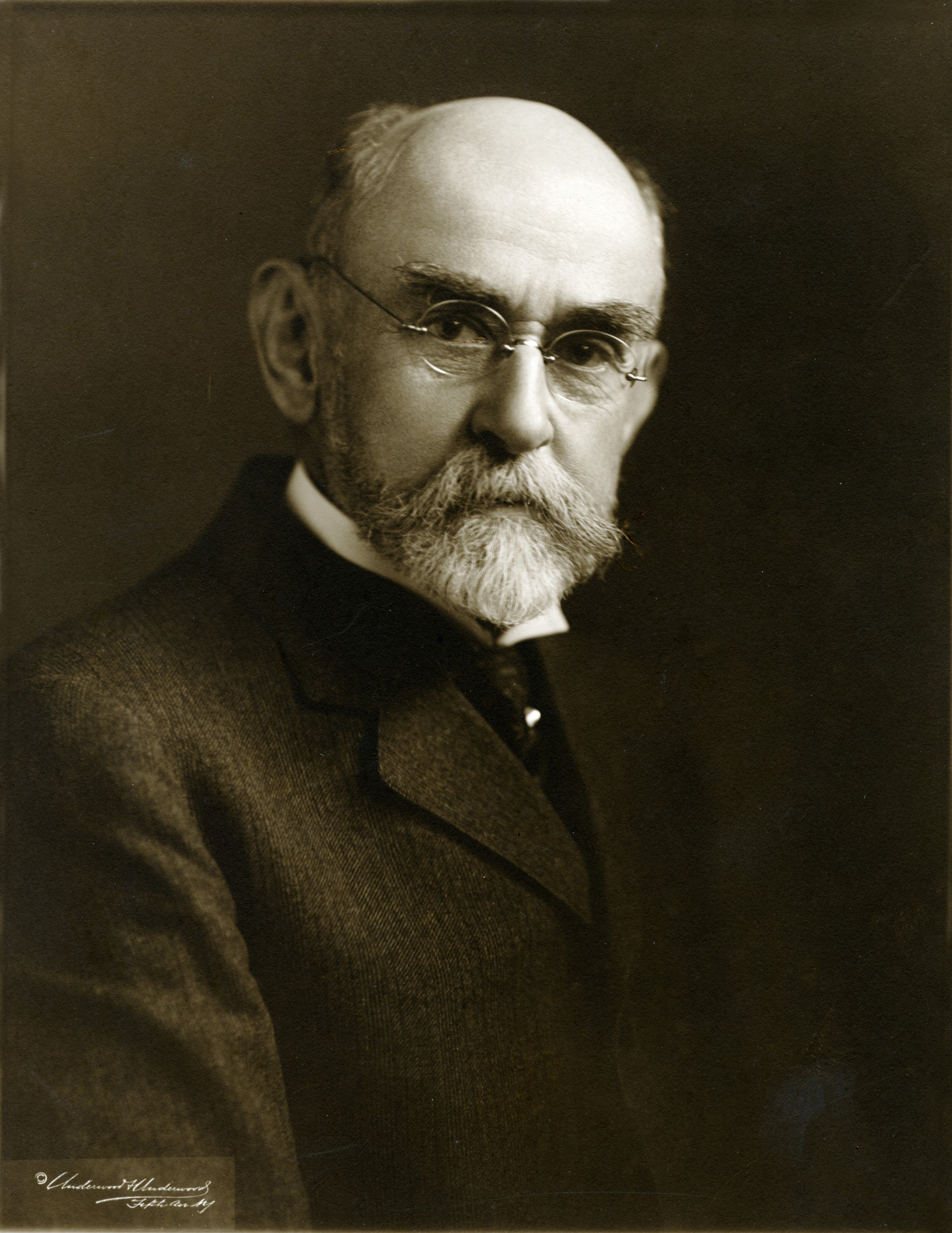
- Joseph Bucklin Bishop, September 1920
- Born: Joseph Bucklin Bishop; September 5, 1847; Seekonk, Massachusetts, U.S.
- Education: Brown University
- Occupations: Journalist; Biographer
- Spouse: Harriet Hartwell Bishop (1848–1917)
- Children: Hartwell Bishop (1880-1913); Farnham Bishop (1886-1930); Alice Bishop (1876-1924)
- Parent(s): James Madison Bishop (1812–1864); Elzada Balcom Bishop(1808–1892)

Joseph Bucklin Bishop (September 5, 1847 – December 13, 1928), was an American newspaper editor (1870–1905), Secretary of the Isthmian Canal Commission in Washington, D.C., and Panama (1905–1914), and authorized biographer and close friend of President Theodore Roosevelt. Bishop was the author of 13 books and dozens of magazine articles, and he edited the 1920 best-seller, Theodore Roosevelt’s Letters to His Children.

== Childhood, family and education ==
Bishop was born September 5, 1847, in Seekonk, Massachusetts, today the village of Rumford in East Providence, Rhode Island. He was the sixth of seven children of James Madison Bishop (1812–1864), a farmer, and Elzada Balcom Bishop (1808–1892), a homemaker. His ancestors were early New England settlers, arriving in Salem, Massachusetts, from England in 1639. Bridget Bishop, his great grandmother via marriage, was the first woman executed during the Salem Witch Trials of the 1690s. Shortly after Bridget's death on June 10, 1692, the family escaped to Rehoboth, Massachusetts, where many later generations of Bishops lived and worked. Joseph's great grandfather, Phanuel Bishop, a wealthy innkeeper in Rehoboth, led a company of Minutemen that marched on the alarm of the "shot heard ‘round the world" at the Old North Bridge in Concord, Massachusetts. Phanuel Bishop was a member of the United States Congress from Massachusetts (1799–1807) and a delegate to the Massachusetts Constitutional Convention of 1778 in Boston.

Joseph grew up on his family farm, graduated from Pawtucket, Rhode Island, High School in 1866 and from Brown University, with a Bachelor of Arts degree, in 1870. An early Providence Journal profile recorded that he was "a genial, companionable fellow" but "did not rank high in his class (of 53)... as a matter of fact he was not a brilliant scholar." He supported himself through college by working on the editorial staff of the Providence Morning Herald, a short-lived Democratic voice in local politics.

Joseph married Harriet Louisa Hartwell (1848–1917) in the Newman Congregational Church in Rehoboth, December 14, 1872. Raised on a New Hampshire farm, Harriet was the fourth of five children of Samuel Estabrook Hartwell and Lucy King Hartwell. She was orphaned at age 11 and sent to live with relatives, John and Harriet Hartwell in Providence. Harriet's great-great grandfather, Ephraim, owned a popular tavern in Concord, Massachusetts during the early days of the Revolution. Hartwell's Tavern is now an historic landmark, situated along Concord's Battle Road, and managed as a visitor attraction by the National Park Service.

== Early career ==
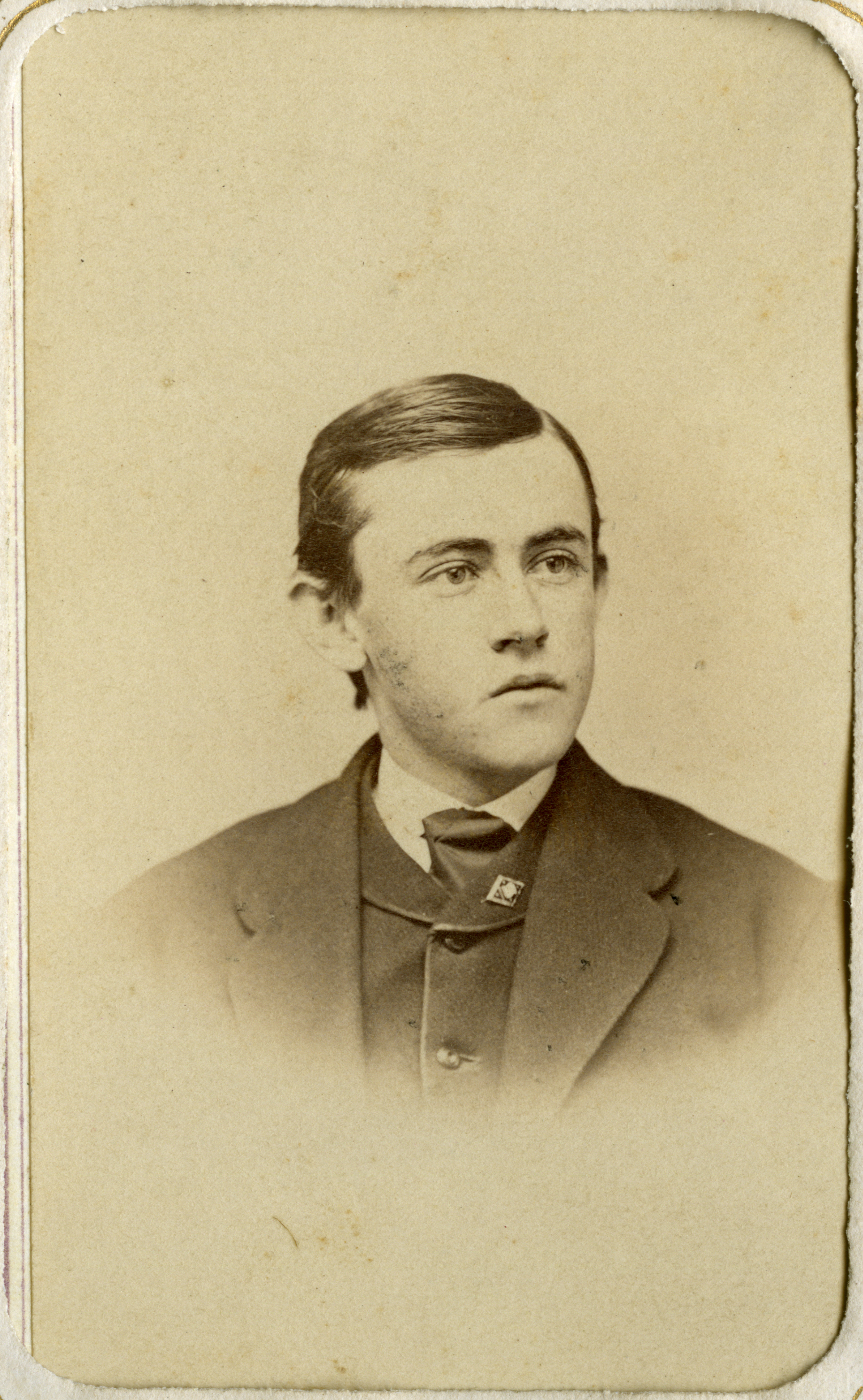
Joseph Bucklin Bishop shortly after graduating from Brown University in 1870

At the time of his marriage, Bishop was working on the city staff of the New York Tribune, edited by Horace Greeley. It was, arguably, the nation's leading newspaper of the time. Bishop recorded that in spite of a shabby work environment on Printing House Square in lower Manhattan, the Tribune’s offices “harbored a moral and intellectual spirit that I met nowhere else in my 35 years of journalistic experience.” After just six months, he was promoted to the paper's editorial staff where he came under the tutelage of a senior editor, John Milton Hay, former assistant secretary to President Abraham Lincoln and future United States Secretary of State under President Theodore Roosevelt. To supplement his meager income, Bishop moonlighted as an American correspondent for the London Daily News. His historically-significant dispatches included reports of the assassination of President James A. Garfield and the grand opening of the magnificent Brooklyn Bridge.

== Mid career ==
In July 1883, Bishop departed the Tribune for Edwin Godkin’s New York Evening Post, “the home of absolute intellectual freedom, intellectual courage and intellectual honesty.” For more than a decade and a half, from the waning days of Reconstruction to the close of the Industrial Revolution, Bishop thrived professionally under Godkin's tutelage. He recalled his years there as “the most enjoyable and profitable” of his journalistic career. Bishop's advocacy led to the institutionalization of the paper's groundbreaking Voter's Guide (to counter Tammany Hall propaganda) and the adoption in New York of the novel Australian paper ballot by which voters selected candidates for office in private, on impartial, state-produced forms. His determined investigative research helped to uncover and publicize incriminating letters by James G. Blaine, the 1884 Republican presidential nominee. The so-called Mulligan Letters played a critical role in the candidate's eventual defeat. Later on, Bishop helped Godkin publish a series of “biographies” of leading Tammany Hall figures that exposed their roles in crime and corruption in New York City Hall.

== Initial work with Theodore Roosevelt ==
Bishop's association with Theodore Roosevelt began in the spring of 1895 when TR, as New York City Police Commission president, was radically reforming the corrupt and patronage-laden force. Roosevelt welcomed the editorial support he received from Bishop at the Evening Post, and they began a correspondence that would number more than 600 letters over 25 years. Early on, when Bishop's loyalty was questioned, Roosevelt put his journalist friend to a stern personal test, challenging his allegiance in an eyeballs-to-eyeballs confrontation. Bishop passed without flinching, and Roosevelt declared, “What I value in you is that you give me the advice you think I need rather than the advice you think I’d like to have.”

With the retirement of Godkin in 1899 and anti-Roosevelt sentiment rising among new Evening Post managers, Bishop joined an exodus of writers to the rival New York Commercial Advertiser (later the Globe and Commercial Advertiser) where he became chief of editorial writers. Working alongside editor John Henry Wright, Bishop helped evolve the scrawny weakling of a paper into a dignified, readable journal – a clear alternative to the “yellow” rags of William R. Hearst and Joseph Pulitzer. Bishop editorialized vigorously against a scheme by New York State power brokers to kick Governor Theodore Roosevelt “upstairs” to the Vice Presidency on the William McKinley ticket. But when Roosevelt was nominated by the Republicans, Bishop fell into line, helping to strategize his New York general election campaign. When Roosevelt assumed the Presidency in 1901, on McKinley's assassination, Bishop editorialized, “Nobody who has followed Theodore Roosevelt’s public career or has had the privilege of personal acquaintance with him has any doubt about his ability to fill with honor to himself and usefulness to the country the high office upon which he has entered.”

=== The Panama years ===
Bishop's strong editorial backing of Roosevelt's armed support of the 1903 Panamanian revolution and the subsequent construction of the Panama Canal, linking the Atlantic and Pacific oceans, and his vigorous advocacy of Roosevelt's election as President in 1904, won him Roosevelt's nod to become executive secretary of the Isthmian Canal Commission in Washington, D.C., the following year. Bishop was tasked with managing the Commission's day-to-day matters but also with ensuring public support for the canal through press agentry and by keeping the project's official history.

Bishop's promised $10,000 annual salary was relentlessly criticized by Roosevelt's opponents in Congress, mostly because it was twice what each of them made. Opposition newspapers joined in the criticism. When, in the summer of 1907, escalating allegations of cronyism surrounding Bishop's appointment threatened appropriations for Panama Canal construction, Secretary of War, William Howard Taft, surely with Roosevelt's quiet consent, ordered Bishop out of Washington to Panama where the partisan political heat would be less intense. “I accept your decision without reluctance,” Bishop informed Taft, “and shall go to the Isthmus, not sadly but cheerfully.” It would not be his first trip to Panama. In the fall of the previous year, Bishop had gone ahead to advance Roosevelt's historic inspection tour, the first time a sitting president had journeyed outside the U.S.

Joseph Bucklin Bishop would, except for month-long summer breaks, remain on the isthmus for seven years, serving clandestinely at first as Theodore Roosevelt's “eyes and ears.” He reported back on the “astonishing” progress that Army Corps of Engineers Colonel George Washington Goethals and his team were making, excavating the “big ditch” and building dams and locks. Before long, Bishop became Goethals's trusted aide, serving as his first line of defense against workers with complaints and grievances.

In Panama, Bishop became founding editor of The Canal Record, a weekly newspaper read by workers in Panama. He reported on cubic yards dug by rival work divisions, and the compedtitive baseball games they played. The “good news” of The Canal Record also built vital public support on newspaper editorial pages back home and in the halls of the United States Congress where annual appropriations required to keep the canal project moving forward.

== Legacy ==
Bishop departed Panama a few weeks before the official opening of the canal in August 1914 to resume his literary career in New York. His book, The Panama Gateway, a comprehensive history of the canal, won wide and favorable reviews.

Bishop's contribution to the nation's war effort, at age 70, was in service as general manager, in charge of day-to-day administration of the American Society for the Relief of French War Orphans, a philanthropic organization based in New York.

It was during Theodore Roosevelt's hospitalization in late 1918, near the end of his life, that Bishop disclosed that he wanted to publish examples of letters TR had written to his children when they were young. Theodore Roosevelt’s Letters to his Children, released in 1919, became a national best seller and made Bishop economically self-sufficient for the remainder of his life.

Shortly after Roosevelt's return from his near-death expedition to Brazil 1914 he startled Bishop by declaring, "I know what I wish you would do - write the story of my public life. You know it almost as well as I know it myself." To ensure that Bishop had the resources to accurately tell the story, TR pledged, "I will turn all my official and private correspondence over to you for your exclusive control." Events leading to World War I delayed the project until late 1918 when Roosevelt directed the Library of Congress to give Bishop full access to his papers. Bishop worked resolutely on the authorized biography, as told through Roosevelt's letters, previewing the early chapters with the subject himself. It wasn't until the fall of 1920 that the work was published in two volumes. The New York Times reviewer concluded that the book "has been carried to completion with... delicate discretion, with instinctive tact and a high courage which Roosevelt would be the first to recognize." Later, Edith Roosevelt would tell Bishop, "I do not wish to flatter, but who else could have done it?"

== Death ==
On December 17, 1928, 81-year-old Joseph Bucklin Bishop had finished the first four chapters of his biography of George Washington Goethals when he retired to his solitary room at the University Club of New York. Sometime during the early-morning hours of the 18th, he took gravely ill. He was found dead when he did not come down to breakfast. The official cause of death was Carditis.

Following a service at the Church of the Incarnation (New York City) Bishop's remains were cremated, and he was laid to rest alongside his wife, Harriet, and two of his children, Alice and Hartwell, at Kensico Cemetery in Valhalla, New York.

== New biography on Bishop in 2011 ==
A book on Bishop and his quarter-century friendship with Theodore Roosevelt was published in fall 2011. "The Lion and the Journalist," was authored by Bishop's great-great nephew, Chip Bishop of Cape Cod. The book makes use of published and unpublished sources on Bishop's life including hundreds of letters exchanged with Roosevelt and materials from the Bishop family archives.

== See also ==
- Theodore Roosevelt
- Panama Canal

== Bibliography ==
- Bishop, Joseph Bucklin, ed. (1920), Theodore Roosevelt and His Time Shown in His Own Letters vol. 1; vol 2
- Bishop, Joseph Bucklin, The Panama Gateway 1913
- Bishop, Joseph Bucklin (ed), Theodore Roosevelt's Letters to His Children 1919
- Bishop, Joseph Bucklin, Notes and Anecdotes of Many Years 1925
- Bishop, Joseph Bucklin and Bishop, Farnham, Goethals: Genius of the Panama Canal 1930
