= Henry Latimer Seaver =

American academic

Henry Latimer Seaver (1878–1975) was an American academic.

== Life ==
Seaver was born in Boston on January 16, 1878. His parents were Latimer Small and Minnie Church Seaver. He was educated at Boston Latin School and Harvard College, where he graduated in 1900. From 1901 until retirement in 1945, he taught English and History, and later Architecture, at the Massachusetts Institute of Technology. On September 14, 1908, he married Susan Russell Seaver, who died in 1964.

From 1932 until 1972 he was an active member of the Massachusetts Historical Society, the library of which became the focus of his activities in retirement.

He died at home in Lexington, Massachusetts, on November 26, 1975.

== Publications ==
- The Great Revolt in Castile (1928)
