= Joseph Murray (politician) =

American political operative and immigration official

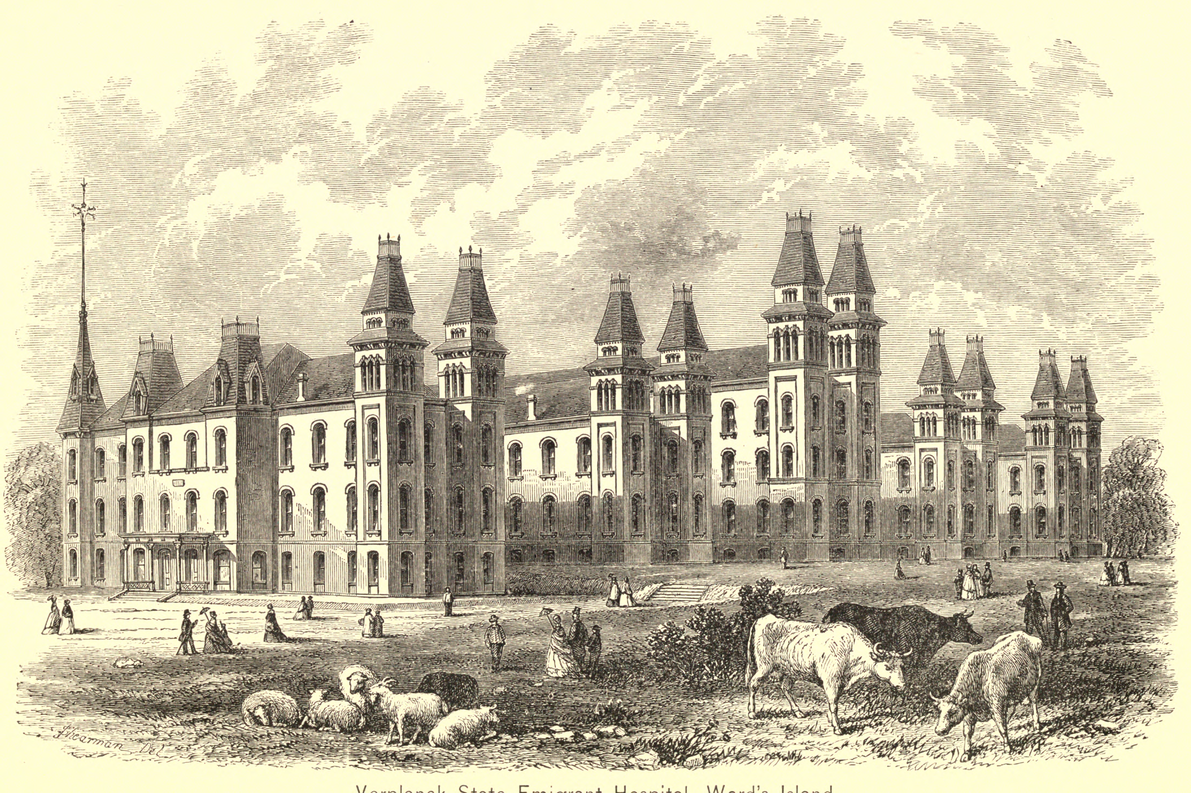
- Immigration and the Commissioners of Emigration of the state of New York

U.S. Commissioner of Immigration for the Port of New York
- In office 1902–1909
- President: Theodore Roosevelt

President of the New York Board of Excise Commissioners
- In office 1895–1896

Personal details
- Born: 1 January 1844 Ireland
- Died: 20 July 1926 (aged 82) New York City, New York, U.S.
- Party: Republican (formerly Democratic)

Joseph Murray (1844 – 1926) was an Irish-American political operative, Republican Party leader, and federal public official in New York City. He is best known in American history for "discovering" Theodore Roosevelt and engineering Roosevelt's first political nomination to the New York State Assembly in 1881, effectively launching the career of the future president.

== Early life ==
Murray was born in Ireland in 1846 and immigrated to the United States as a child. He grew up in New York City, where he became involved in the rough-and-tumble street politics of the post-Civil War era. He initially aligned himself with Tammany Hall, the powerful Democratic political machine, working as a political organizer and enforcer in the city's working-class wards.

== Shift to the Republican Party ==
Disillusioned by his treatment by Tammany Hall leadership, Murray broke ranks and joined the Republican Party. He quickly rose through the ranks of the local Republican organization in Manhattan, eventually becoming a prominent ward leader and political lieutenant in New York's 21st District, an area that encompassed both wealthy enclaves of Fifth Avenue and poorer working-class neighborhoods.

=== "Discovery" of Theodore Roosevelt ===
In the autumn of 1881, the local Republican machine, led by boss "Jake" Hess, planned to renominate an incumbent assemblyman whom Murray and other reform-minded faction members opposed. Seeking a fresh candidate who could appeal to both the elite and working-class voters of the 21st District, Murray set his sights on a 23-year-old, Harvard-educated aristocrat named Theodore Roosevelt., who frequented the headquarters of the local Republican organization at Morton Hall.

Despite resistance from established party bosses who viewed the eccentric, wealthy Roosevelt as an outsider and a "silk-stocking" idealist, Murray independently engineered Roosevelt's nomination at the district convention. Murray strategically gathered proxies and outmaneuvered the machine loyalists to secure Roosevelt's spot on the ballot.

During the 1881 campaign, Murray personally escorted the young Roosevelt through the district, introducing him to saloon owners, laborers, and local voters. Roosevelt won the election, beginning his rapid ascent in American public life. Roosevelt later credited Murray in his autobiography for launching his public career, noting that Murray had managed the nomination entirely on his own initiative.

=== Later political career ===
Murray remained a loyal political ally and lifelong friend of Roosevelt. As Roosevelt's political capital grew, Murray's influence within the New York Republican infrastructure expanded.

In October 1887, Roosevelt endorsed Murray for his election as alderman to the New York State Assembly.

Murray was later appointed to serve as the President of the New York Board of Excise Commissioners, a powerful municipal role regulating the city's liquor trade.

During the presidency of Theodore Roosevelt, Murray was appointed to the federal position of Assistant Commissioner of Immigration in 1902 for the Port of New York, overseeing operations at Ellis Island during a period of peak immigration. Murray was ousted from the position in May 1909, after Roosevelt had left office.

== Death and legacy ==
Murray died in 1926 at the age of 82. While his own political offices were notable, his historical legacy remains tied to his role as the political kingmaker who brought Theodore Roosevelt into American electoral politics.

== See also ==
- Electoral history of Theodore Roosevelt
- The Rise of Theodore Roosevelt
