= Ernest Hallen =

American photographer (1875–1947)

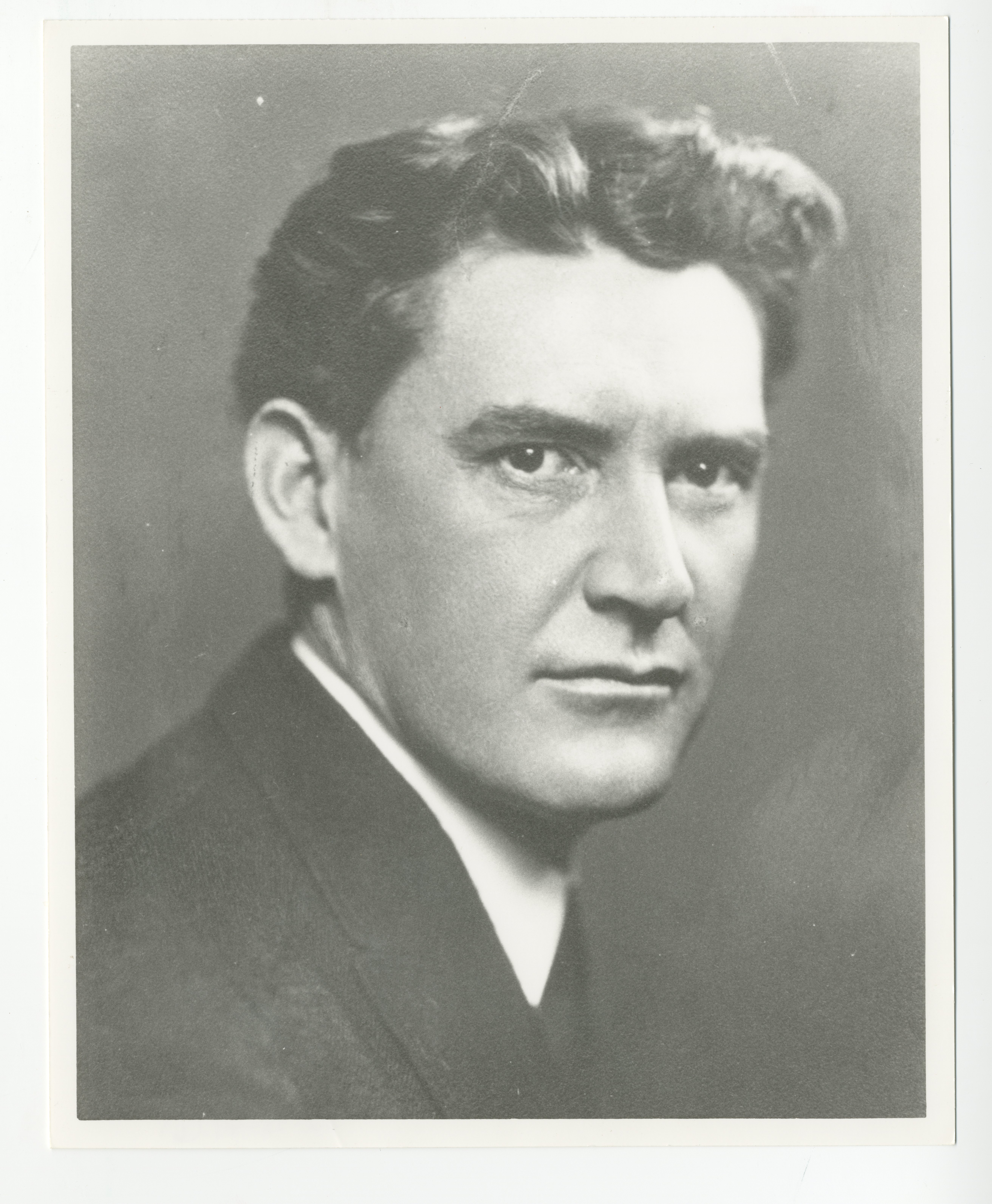
- Born: 1875; Atlanta, Georgia
- Died: 1947 (aged 71–72); Monterey Park, California
- Citizenship: United States
- Occupation: Photographer
- Years active: 1907 - 1937
- Employer: Isthmian Canal Commission
- Organization: Isthmian Canal Commission
- Known for: Official photographer of the Panama Canal
- Spouse: Maude Hallen
- Children: 2 daughters
- Awards: Roosevelt Medal

Ernest “Red” Hallen (1875–1947) was an American photographer, noted for his 30 years of work as the official photographer of the Panama Canal.

== Life and work ==
Hallen was born in Atlanta, Georgia, in 1875. After spending six years in Puerto Rico and two years in Cuba, he was appointed as the official photographer of the Panama Canal by the Isthmian Canal Commission in 1907. Hallen was contracted to capture “… a series of photographs… about once a month… to show construction progress” to satisfy both Washington and the American public. In addition to showing the construction and progress of the Panama Canal, Hallen depicted the day-to-day life of the “Zonians” – Americans living in the Panama Canal Zone - and its development over the course of the years. Throughout his 30-year career, Hallen produced between 12,000 and 16,000 images, each with a “strangely satisfying aesthetic experience” portraying life in the Panama Canal Zone. For his service to the Panama Canal Zone and as an employee of the Isthmian Canal Commission, Hallen was awarded the Roosevelt Medal with two bars.

Hallen retired as the official photographer of the Panama Canal Zone in 1937, after 30 years of service. Hallen and his wife Maude then moved to Monterey Park, California. Hallen died in 1947 at the age of 72.

The University of Florida Digital Collections maintains an extensive collection of Hallen's work for the Isthmian Canal Commission.

== Gallery ==
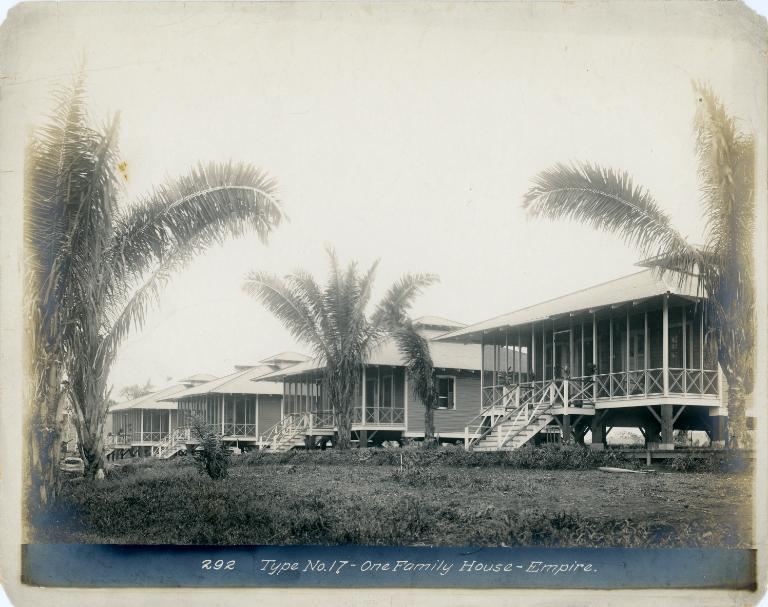
One Family House in Empire, south of Las Cascadas

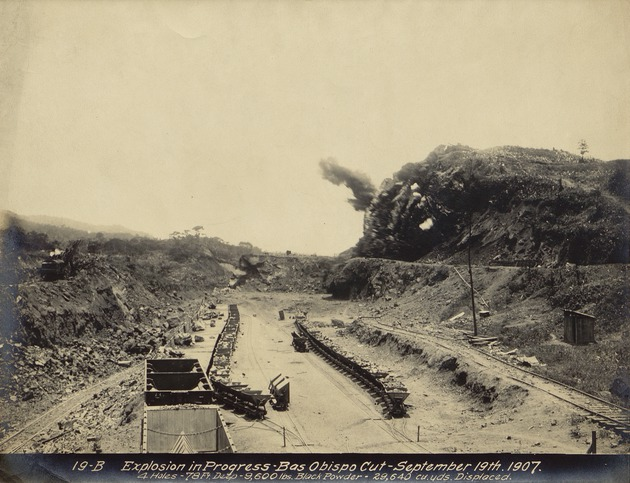
Explosion in Progress-Bas Obispo Cut, September 19, 1907

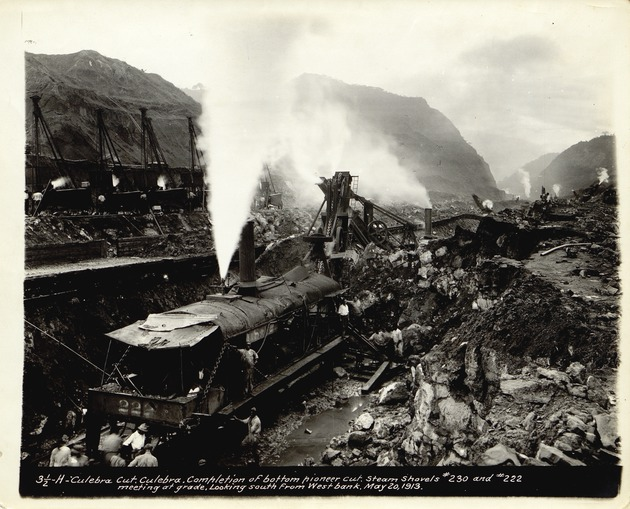
Shovels at work at Culebra Cut, May 20, 1913

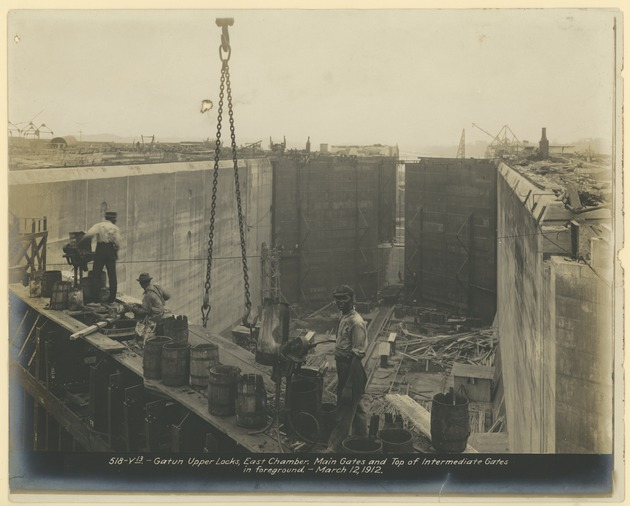
Gatun Upper Locks, March 12, 1912

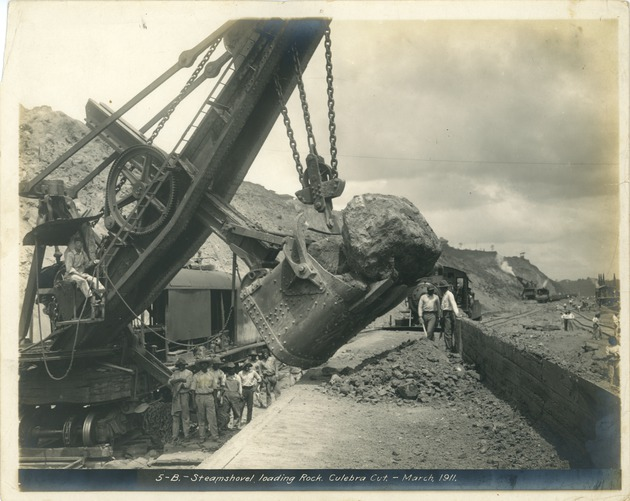
Steamshovel Loading Rock, March 1911

== Sources ==
- Building the Panama Canal: Photos by Ernest Hallen. Museum of Fine Arts, n.d. Web. 9 July 2014.
- Photographs of the Construction of the Panama Canal, 1887-1940. OPA- Online Public Access, n.d. Web. 9 July 2014.
- Longwell, Dennis (Winter 1976–1977). "Panama Canal Photographs by Ernest "Red" Hallen". Art Journal. 36 (2): 123–125. doi:10.1080/00043249.1977.10793337. JSTOR 776159.
- Roosevelt Medal Holders University of Florida Digital Collections, n.d. Web. 9 July 2014: 81.
