= Edward Hubert Butler Sr. =

American journalist

Edward Hubert Butler I
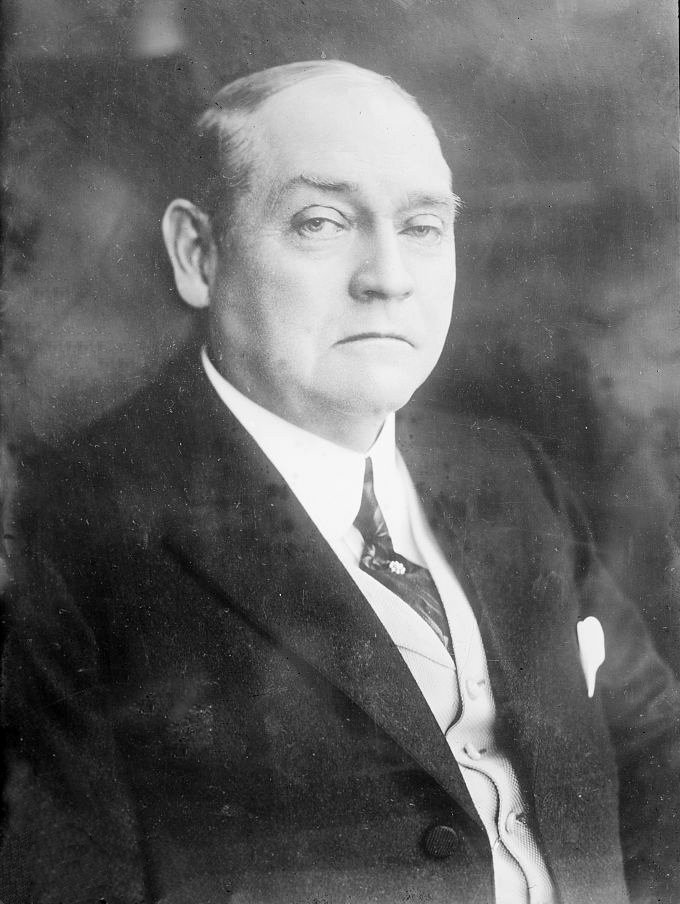
- Born: c. 1850; Le Roy, New York, U.S.
- Died: March 9, 1914; Buffalo, New York, U.S.
- Occupation: Newspaper publisher
- Known for: Founder of The Buffalo Evening News'
- Spouse: Mary Elizabeth Barber (m. 1871–1893)
- Children: Edward Hubert Butler Jr.

Edward Hubert Butler I (c. 1850 - March 9, 1914) was the founder of The Buffalo Evening News in 1880.

== Biography ==
He was born in about 1850 in Le Roy, Genesee County, New York and attended local schools.

His news career began with the local paper The Le Roy Gazette (in Le Roy, New York), then moved on to The Scranton Times as city editor and the same position at The Scranton Free Press.

Butler moved to Buffalo in 1873 to start the news and later The Bradford Sunday News in 1879.

He was the father of Edward Hubert Butler Jr., who was publisher and editor of the Evening News as well as owner of two local radio stations.

Butlter Sr. married Mary Elizabeth Barber in 1871, who died in 1893.

Butler died in Buffalo, New York on March 9, 1914. His publishing business was left to his son.

== Politics ==
Butler was a Republican and involved in state politics (with the Board of Electors of the State of New York). He was a presidential elector in the 1896 and 1900 presidential elections. He was a delegate to the 1908 Republican National Convention.

== Legacy ==
- E. H. Butler Library at Buffalo State College was dedicated in 1950.
