= Theodore Roosevelt Association =

American historical and cultural organization

The Theodore Roosevelt Association (TRA) is a historical and cultural organization dedicated to honoring the life and work of Theodore Roosevelt (1858–1919), the 26th President of the United States. The group is based in Oyster Bay, New York, on Long Island, where Roosevelt spent summers in his youth and would relocate in his adulthood.

== History ==
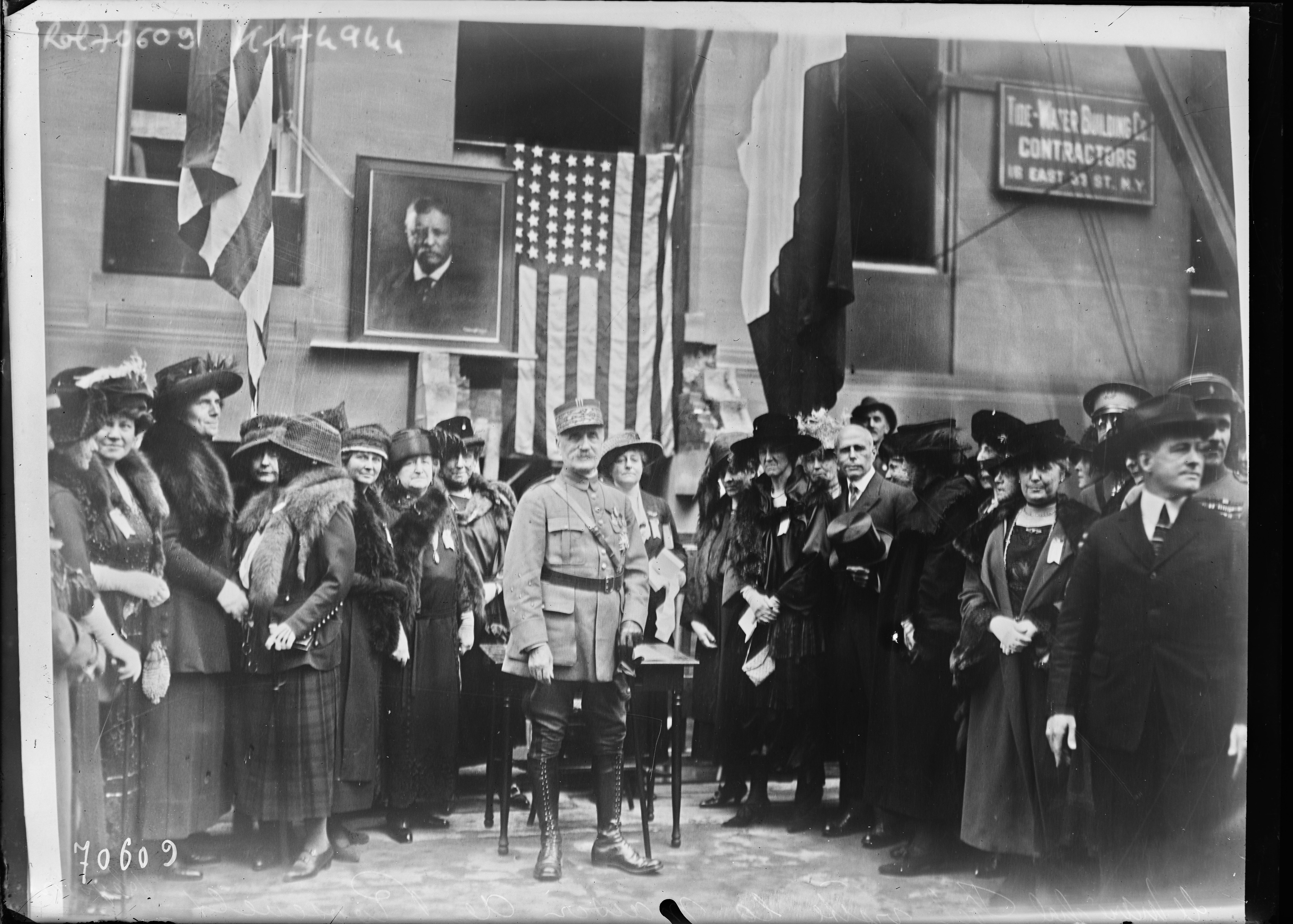
Mme John Henry Hammond, WTRA, with Ferdinand Foch, 1921.

The organization was founded in 1919 by friends and supporters of the president originally as the Permanent Memorial National Committee. Soon renamed the Roosevelt Memorial Association (RMA), it was chartered under Title 36 of the United States Code in 1920.

In parallel with the RMA was an organization for women, The Women's Theodore Roosevelt Association, that had been founded in 1919 by an act of the New York State Assembly. The organizations merged in 1956 under the current name.

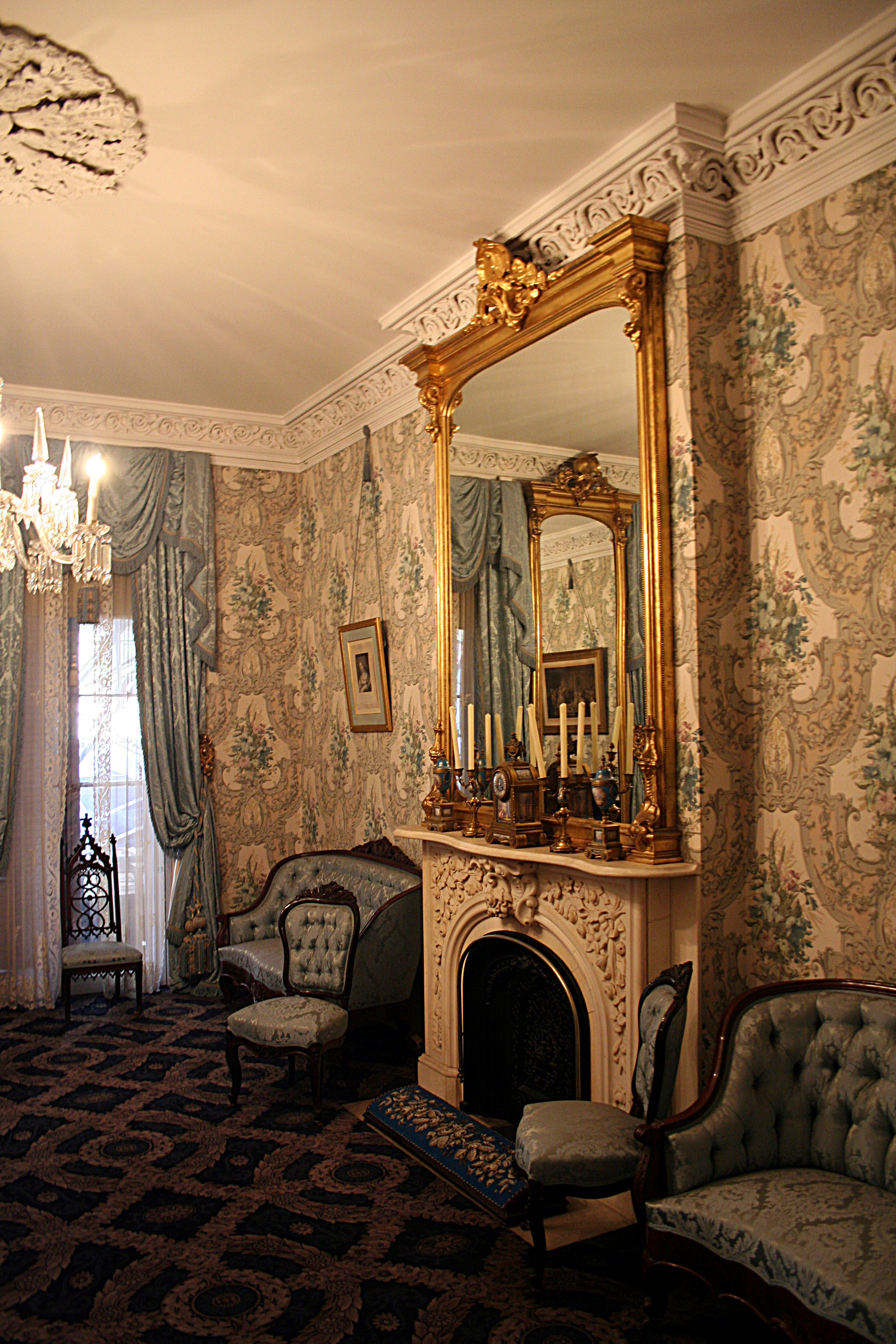
Sitting room in the Theodore Roosevelt Birthplace National Historic Site on East 20th Street in New York City. The building was rebuilt by the Women's Theodore Roosevelt Memorial Association in the 1920s and donated to the National Park Service by the Theodore Roosevelt Association in 1963.

The two ancestor organizations that eventually combined to form the modern TRA established four public sites: the reconstructed Theodore Roosevelt Birthplace National Historic Site in New York City, dedicated in 1923 and donated to the National Park Service in 1963; Theodore Roosevelt Memorial Park in Oyster Bay, Long Island, New York, dedicated in 1928 and given to the people of Oyster Bay; Theodore Roosevelt Island in the Potomac River in Washington, D.C., given to the federal government in 1932; and Sagamore Hill, Roosevelt's Oyster Bay home, which opened to the public in 1953 and, together with nearby Old Orchard, home to Theodore Roosevelt Jr., was donated to the National Park Service in 1963.

Along with the 1963 gifts of the Birthplace and Sagamore Hill properties, the TRA donated an endowment to help support both sites. The TRA currently owns Theodore Roosevelt's simple cabin, "Pine Knot", near Charlottesville, Virginia, which is managed by the Edith and Theodore Roosevelt Pine Knot Foundation.

=== Theodore Roosevelt Collection ===
One of the two TRA ancestor organizations, the Roosevelt Memorial Association (RMA), collected manuscripts, diaries, correspondence and other items relating to Roosevelt's personal and professional life. In 1923, the RMA opened a research library at the Birthplace in New York City and continued to build its archive. During 1943, the organization presented the entire collection of materials to Harvard University, Roosevelt's alma mater. Today the Theodore Roosevelt Collection is housed in Harvard's Houghton Library. The collection continues to be a major resource for the study of the life and times of the 26th president of the United States.

The only larger Theodore Roosevelt Collection is that at the Library of Congress, which includes Roosevelt's Presidential Papers, donated personally by Roosevelt.

=== Theodore Roosevelt Film Collection ===
The compilation of the film collection was originally embarked upon by the RMA in January 1919. Later, during 1924, the RMA formally established the Roosevelt Motion Picture Library housed at the Birthplace. The TRA donated the Roosevelt Motion Picture Library to the Library of Congress in 1962.

=== Leadership of the TRA ===
Led in the years 1919–1957 by Secretary and Director Hermann Hagedorn (1882–1964), the Association engaged in a wide spectrum of programs and activities to preserve Roosevelt's memory. Dr. John Allen Gable served as executive director from 1974 until his sudden death in early 2005.

== Activities ==
In recent years, the organization's endeavors included creation and maintenance of About Theodore Roosevelt, the TRA web site at http://www.theodoreroosevelt.org, which has been criticized by scholars as hagiographic and hard to navigate. The organization also conducts the Theodore Roosevelt^{R} Police Awards (given in New York, Dallas, Boston, and Nashville to police officers who have overcome handicaps), and the Theodore Roosevelt Teddy Bear program, which each year gives teddy bears to hospitalized children in New York City and Nashville during the December Holiday season. The TRA also publishes a quarterly journal, conducts occasional historical and educational conferences, and sponsors public speaking contests for high school students in New York.

=== Annual Dinner/Meetings ===
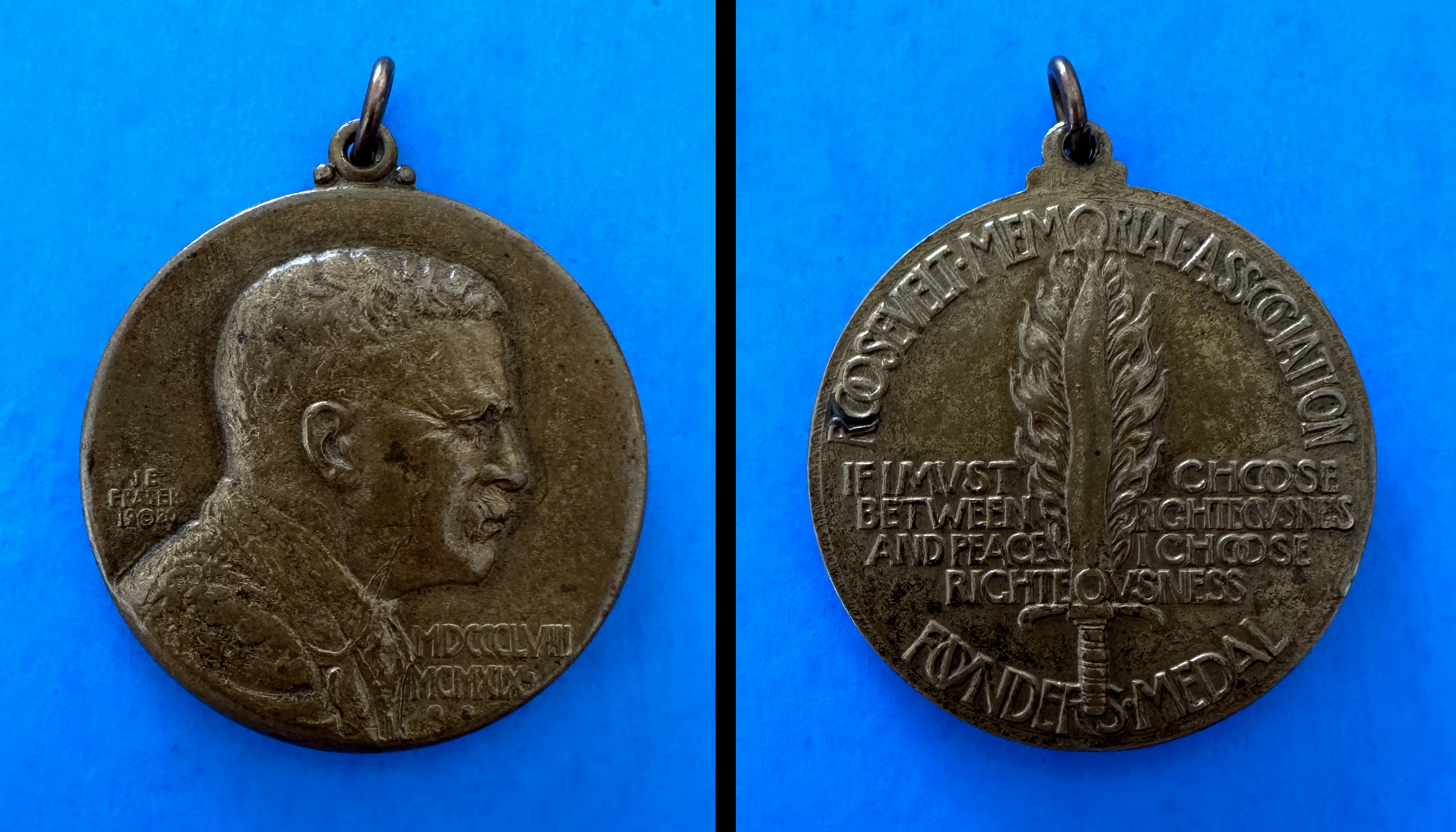
Roosevelt Memorial Association Founders Medal

Annual meetings of the Theodore Roosevelt Association - held near TR's October 27 birthday - occur generally in places that are somehow associated with TR, such as Boston/Cambridge, where he attended college and met his first wife; New York/Oyster Bay, where he lived most of his life; Norfolk, around the USS Theodore Roosevelt; Washington, where he worked as Assistant Secretary of the Navy, Vice President and President; Atlanta, where his mother grew up; and even the Netherlands, where the Roosevelts originated. The annual dinner frequently includes the awarding of the Theodore Roosevelt Distinguished Service Medal. Annual meetings often include lectures on TR, visits to Roosevelt-related sites, and silent auctions and bartering/selling of TR collectibles by collector members of the association.

== Members of the TRA board ==
TR's great-grandson Tweed Roosevelt serves as the organization's president as of 2010. He is joined on the board and in the association by members from a wide variety of walks of life, and numerous members of the Roosevelt family, including great-grandson Mark Ames, great-granddaughter Susan Roosevelt Weld, great-great-grandson Simon Roosevelt, great-grandson Theodore Roosevelt IV, and several cousins. Other members include but are not limited to those in finance, the judicial/legal arenas, the military, and teaching.

== Membership ==
Interests of the membership are as varied as were Theodore Roosevelt's own interests. Members include Rough Rider fans, political memorabilia collectors, and Theodore Roosevelt impersonators. Some members join simply because they enjoy Teddy bears.

Membership in the Association includes a subscription to the quarterly TRA Journal, and invitations to association functions. Members also receive free admission to Sagamore Hill in Oyster Bay and the Theodore Roosevelt Birthplace in Manhattan, upon presentation of their membership cards.

== See also ==
- Theodore Roosevelt Cyclopedia
