= Hermann Hagedorn =

American poet and author of biographies

Hermann Hagedorn (18 July 1882 – 27 July 1964) was an American author, poet and biographer.

== Life and career ==
Hagedorn was born in New York City and educated at The Hill School. He graduated from Harvard University, where he was awarded the George B. Sohier Prize for literature. He also studied at the University of Berlin, and Columbia University. From 1909 to 1911, he was an instructor in English at Harvard.

Though Hagedorn met Theodore Roosevelt in 1912, he visited Sagamore Hill in 1916 and became a friend. In 1917 Roosevelt proposed that Hagedorn write a biography of Roosevelt, an effort which became The Boys' Life of Theodore Roosevelt, the first of many biographies that Hagedorn wrote. Drawing upon his friendship with Roosevelt, Hagedorn was able to elicit the support of Roosevelt's friends and associates' personal recollections in this book, first published in 1918 and then updated in 1922.

In addition to Hagedorn's works on Roosevelt and the Roosevelt family, Hagedorn also authored books of poetry and many biographies throughout his long career, including works about Leonard Wood, Edwin Arlington Robinson, and Albert Schweitzer. He also served as the director of the Theodore Roosevelt Association from 1919 until 1957, becoming director emeritus until his death in 1964.

== Selected works ==
- A troop of the Guard (1909)
- Poems and Ballads (1912)
- "The Boys' Life of Theodore Roosevelt" (1918)
- "Roosevelt in the Bad Lands" (1921)
- The Book of Courage (1929)
- Leonard Wood, A Biography (Volumes 1 & 2 - 1931)
- Edward Arlington Robinson, a Biography (1938)
- Sunward I've Climbed—The Story of John Magee, Poet and Soldier. Macmillan. 1942. ASIN B0007E0BQC.
- Prophet in the Wilderness: The Story of Albert Schweitzer (1947)
- The Roosevelt Family of Sagamore Hill (1954)
- The Hyphenated Family: An American Saga. Macmillan. 1960. ASIN B0007E0D0G.
