= University of California, Santa Barbara Library =

Library in United States

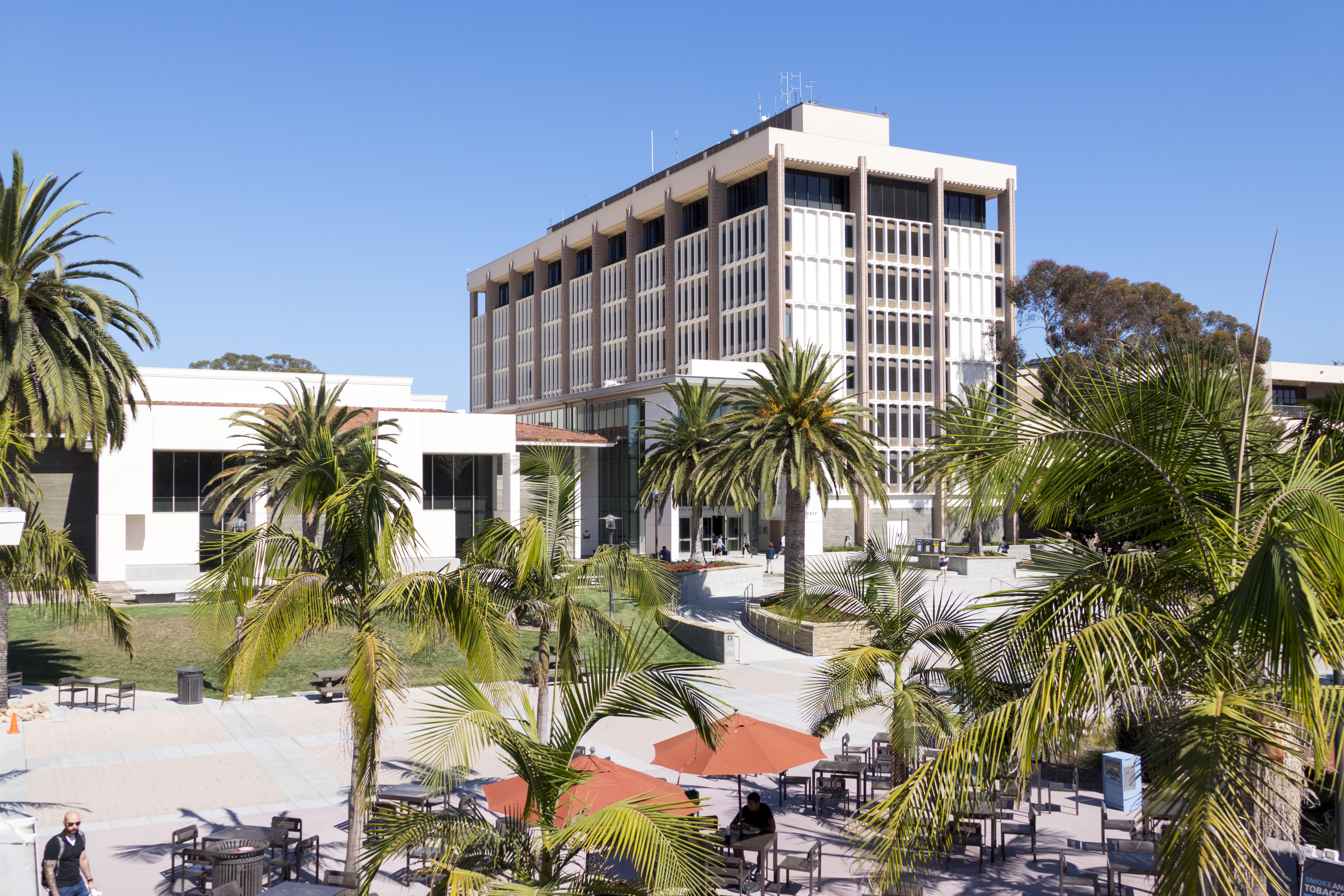
- The UCSB Library holds the majority of the UC Santa Barbara Library's collection.
- 34°24′47.56″N 119°50′42.64″W
- Location: Santa Barbara, California, United States
- Type: University library

Other information
- Director: Todd Grappone, University Librarian
- Website: www.library.ucsb.edu

The University of California, Santa Barbara Library is the university library system of the University of California, Santa Barbara in Santa Barbara, California. The library has some three million print volumes, 30,000 electronic journals, 34,450 e-books, 900,055 digitized items, five million cartographic items (including some 467,000 maps and 3.2 million satellite and aerial images), more than 3.7 million pieces of microform, 167,500 sound recordings, and 4,100 manuscripts. The library states that it holds 3.2 miles (5.1 km) of manuscript and archival collections.

The library serves UC Santa Barbara's students, faculty, and staff. The library is also open to the public, but to borrow materials, individuals not affiliated with the university must purchase a UCSB library card for $100 for one year. However, members of UCSB affiliates may join for a reduced fee, and students and faculty at other University of California campuses, public school teachers, and faculty from reciprocating libraries may also obtain borrowing privileges with no charge, subject to verification. Members of the UC Alumni Association may obtain a courtesy library card, which provides borrowing access, but not access to licensed databases or interlibrary loan, or the ability to check out journals.

The main library has eight floors, with the Pacific View Room on the eighth floor offering a view of the Pacific Ocean.

== Expansion ==
The UCSB Library underwent a major construction project between 2013 and 2016. The project included three parts: a building addition on the north side of UCSB Library, a renovation of the two-story section of UCSB Library, and seismic and code upgrades throughout the existing buildings. The new and renovated facility added 60,000 square feet (5,600 m^{2}) of new space and renovated 90,000 square feet (8,400 m^{2}) more, including a 20% increase in study space, a 24-hour learning commons, a new home for the Art & Architecture Collection, a state-of-the-art Special Research Collections facility, the Interdisciplinary Research Collaboratory, and bookable group study rooms. The project was certified LEED Gold. The $80 million project was funded by a State of California bond sale.

== Main library ==
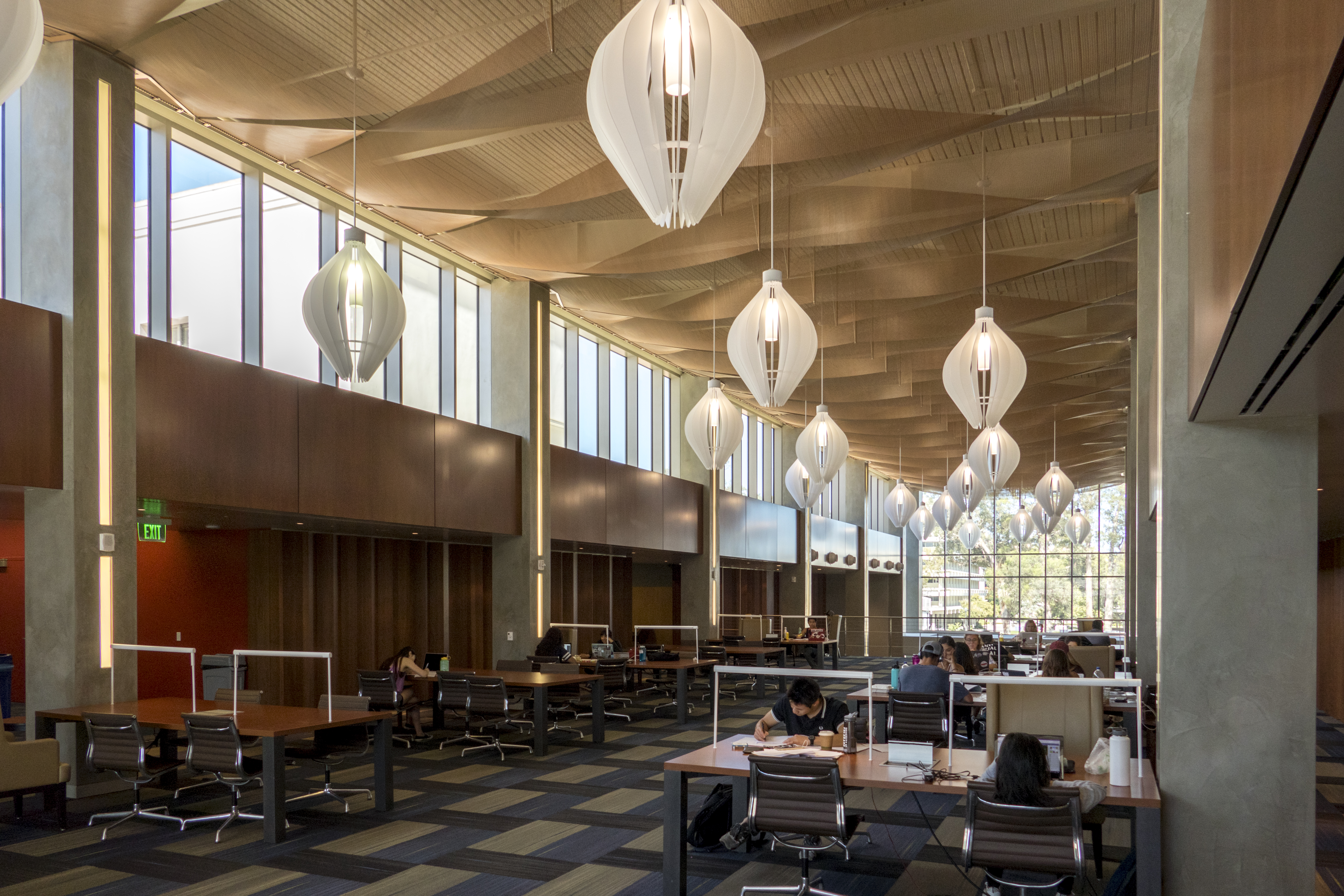
Second Floor reading room of the Library

The main library holds the general collection and several special collections: the Sciences and Engineering Collection, the Map and Imagery Laboratory, Curriculum Resources, the East Asian Collection, the Art & Architecture Collection, and the Ethnic and Gender Studies Collection. The Department of Special Research Collections is also part of the main library. Special Research Collections hold rare books and manuscripts and several collections, which include the Performing Arts Collection, the Wyles Collection on the American West, the Skofield Printers' Collection, and the California Ethnic and Multicultural Archives.

The East Asian Collection was created in 1967 and is housed in the fifth floor of the main library. The East Asian Collection includes around 163,700 volumes of Chinese, Japanese, and Korean-language materials. The bulk of the collection is Chinese (60 percent) and Japanese (39 percent); the library began to acquire Korean works in 1992 when the university began its Korean program, and now has a few hundred titles in Korean.

== Department of Special Research Collections ==
The Department of Special Research Collections acquires, preserves, and makes accessible rare, valuable, or unique materials which support UCSB students, faculty, and research programs, as well as the scholarly community. The department's holdings are non-circulating but are available for research in the reading room. Special Research Collections includes many smaller units, including the following.

- The Humanistic Psychology Archives, founded in 1986, is housed in Special Research Collections. It includes an estimated 1,000 feet (300 m) of material relating to the history of humanistic psychology, including records on the Association for Humanistic Psychology, George I. Brown, James F.T. Bugental, Stanley Keleman, Abraham Maslow, Rollo May, Carl R. Rogers, Virginia Satir, Stewart B. Shapiro, Bob Tannenbaum, and John Vasconcellos. The Archives includes several collections of the personal and professional papers of individuals, including George Leonard, Thomas Yeomans, Alan Watts, and Robert Reasoner.
- The Stuart L. Bernath Memorial Collection includes almost 2,000 books and more than 80 manuscript collections dealing with American diplomatic history and international relations, including the papers of James Stuart Beddie, Stuart L. Bernath, G. William Gahagan, and Charles Montgomery Hathaway. The collection's Wilson-McAdoo Collection focuses on Woodrow Wilson and family, and in particular his daughter, Eleanor Wilson McAdoo.
- The Darwin / Evolution Collection within Special Research Collections includes, among other works, a first edition of Charles Darwin' On the Origin of Species (1859).
- The archives of the Center for the Study of Democratic Institutions, a Santa Barbara-based think tank which existed from 1959 to 1987.
- The Isla Vista Collections of material relating to Isla Vista, with most materials from later 1960s and 1970s, including coverage of the topics such as the anti-Vietnam War protests, Isla Vista riots, and the environmental movement.
- Performing Arts Collection, including recordings, manuscripts, photographs, and other items involving the performing arts. Highlights include the papers of Bernard Herrmann, Lotte Lehmann, Judith Anderson, and Peter Racine Fricker. The collection also includes the Raymond Toole-Stott Circus Collection, which contains some 1,300 monographs on the circus in Europe and America. The Lobero Theatre Papers, also in the Performing Arts Collection, hold the organizational records of the Lobero Theatre, the oldest theater in Southern California.
- A collection of bibles dating as early as the mid-13th century, many of which are illuminated manuscripts. The earliest original items in the collection include copies of the Santa Barbara Bible (c. 1250), Biblia Latina (c. 1297), Biblia sacra Latina (1350); A Noble Fragment (a leaf of the Gutenberg Bible, c. 1450–1455) and the Coverdale Bible (1535). The library also holds bible manuscripts as part of the Isaac Foot Collection.
- A collection of more than 600 vernacular wax cylinder recordings, many of them from a collection amassed by Donald R. Hill, and later by sound historian David Giovannoni, who donated the collection to UCSB in 2013. The Library of Congress added this collection to the National Recording Registry in March 2015.

== California Ethnic and Multicultural Archives ==
California Ethnic and Multicultural Archives (CEMA) is a permanent program of UCSB and a division of the Department of Special Research Collections. Its collections on ethnic studies "document the lives and activities of African Americans, Asian/Pacific Americans, Chicanos/Latinos, and Native Americans in California. The collections represent the cultural, artistic, ethnic, and racial diversity that characterizes the state's population."

Established in 1988, the archives include the papers of many organizations and individuals. Holdings in the African American Collections are papers from Grover Cleveland Barnes, the Bay Area Black Panther Party, William Downey, Charles C. Irby, Anita J. Mackey, Horace J. McMillan, Kincaid Rolle, Tuskegee Airman Lowell Steward, and Samuel L. Williams. Holdings in the Asian/Pacific American Collections include the archives of the Asian American Theater Company, Kearny Street Workshop, Chinese American Democratic Club, Chinese American Political Association, and Chinese American Voters Education Committee, and the papers of Iris Chang, Frank Chin, Bob Hsiang, Nancy Hom, Michio Ito, Genny Lim, Ester Soriano-Hewitt, Gayle Tanaka, Sam Tagatac, Elizabeth Wong, Flo Wong, and Nellie Wong.

Holdings from the Chicano/Latino Collections include the papers of Oscar Zeta Acosta, Norma Alarcón, Juana Alicia, Carlos Almaraz and Los Four, Alurista, Francisco Camplís, Reynaldo J. Carreon, Sean Carrillo, Ana Castillo, Centro Cultural de la Raza, Federico and Bertha Claveria, the Comisíon Femeníl Mexicana Nacional, the Confederation of la Raza Organizations Collection, Lucha Corpi, Bert Corona, Richard (Ricardo) Cruz and Catolicos por la Raza, Eddie Davis (West Coast Eastside Sound Archives), Richard Duardo, Maria Duke Dos Santos, Ricardo Favela, Juan R. Fuentes, Adelina García, Ben Garza, Shifra Goldman, Maya Gonzalez, Hector Gonzalez, Dan Guerrero, Lalo Guerrero, Mark Guerrero, Paul Holguin, Leo Limon, Yolanda Lopez, Ralph Maradiaga, MEChA, Miguel Mendez, Marcy Miranda, José Montoya, the National Network of Hispanic Women, Victor Ochoa, Carlos Ornelas, Sheila Ortiz-Taylor, Ernesto Palomino, James Prigoff, Eloy Rodriguez, Patricia Rodríguez, Charles Rojo, Gil Sanchez, Self Help Graphics & Art, Simon Silva, Alvaro Suman, El Teatro Campesino, Rini Templeton, Mario Torero, Salvador Roberto Torres, Don Tosti (Edmundo Martinez Tostado), Emigdio Vasquez, Luís Valdez, Linda Vallejo, Esteban Villa, and Helena Maria Viramontes.

== Music library ==
The music library is a branch library of the UCSB Library, holding materials relating to music. The music library is housed on the second floor of the Music Department building, and includes some 25,000 LP records. The music collection includes a non-circulating Goethe Collection with almost 200 items relating to Johann Wolfgang von Goethe, including several first and early editions of Goethe's writings and musical settings of his poetry by Franz Schubert, Ludwig van Beethoven, Walther Wolfgang von Goethe, Johann Friedrich Reichardt, and Carl Friedrich Zelter.
