= Kevin Pope =

Kevin Pope may refer to:

- Kevin Pope (cartoonist) (born 1958), whose work has appeared in MAD Magazine
- Kevin O. Pope, former NASA archaeologist and founder of Geo Eco Arch Research
