= Adriana Ocampo =

Colombian planetary geologist (born 1955)

Adriana C. Ocampo Uria
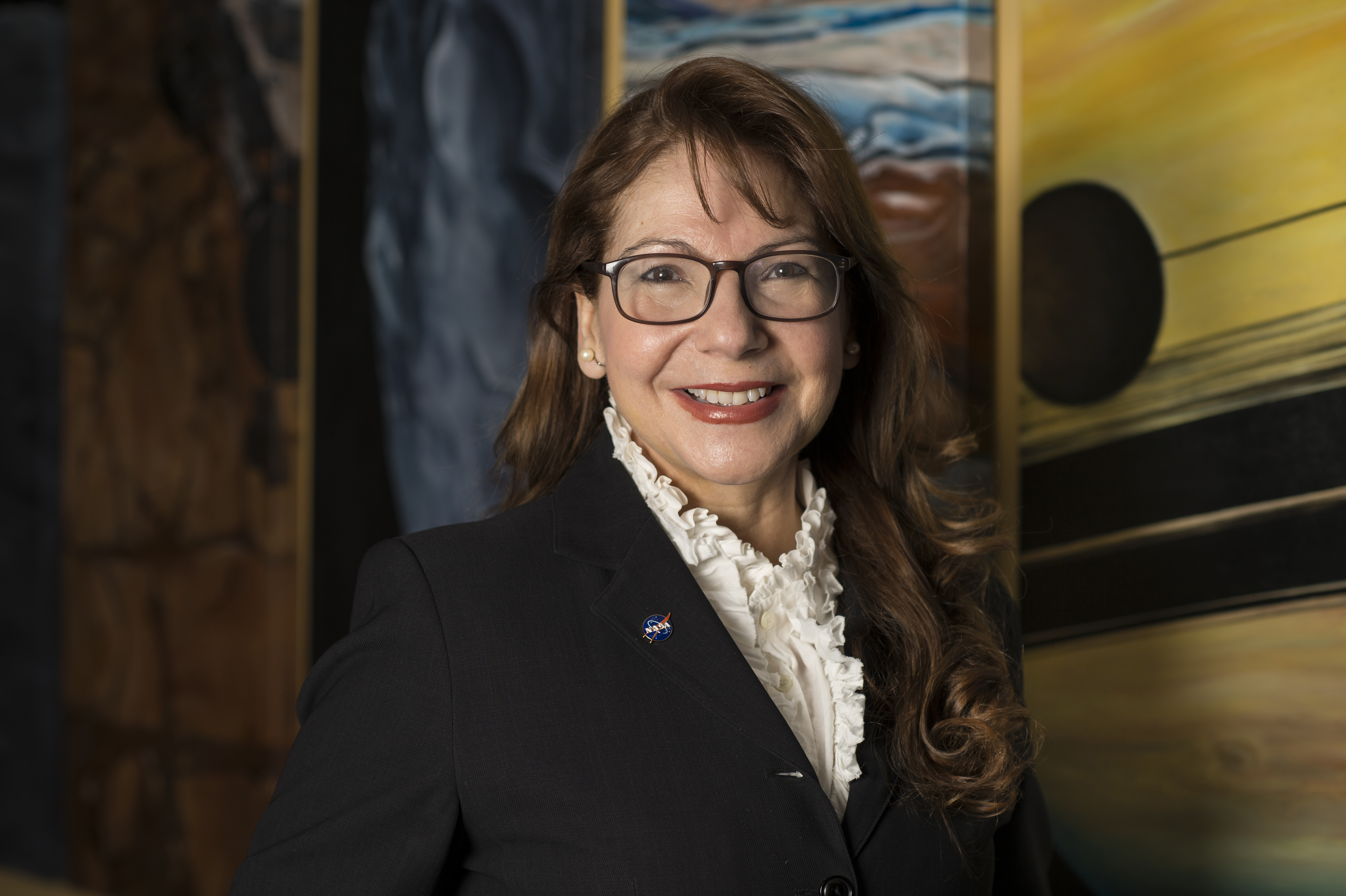
- Born: Adriana C. Ocampo Uria; 5 January 1955 (age 71); Barranquilla, Colombia
- Education: California State University, Los Angeles; California State University, Northridge; Vrije Universiteit, Amsterdam
- Scientific career
- Fields: Planetary science
- Workplaces: Jet Propulsion Laboratory; NASA

Adriana C. Ocampo Uria (born January 5, 1955) is a Colombian-Argentine-American planetary geologist and a former Science Program Manager at NASA Headquarters. In 1970, Ocampo emigrated to California and completed her Bachelor degree at California State University, Los Angeles, then she did her Master in Sciences at California State University, Northridge and finished her PhD at the Vrije Universiteit in the Netherlands. During high school and graduate studies she worked at the Jet Propulsion Laboratory, where she served as the science coordinator for many planetary missions (Viking, Mars Observer, Voyager, Galileo Galileo Missian

She was the first to recognize, using satellite images, that a ring of cenotes or sinkholes, is the only surface impression of the buried Chicxulub crater. This research contributed significantly to the understanding of this impact crater. Ocampo has subsequently led at least seven research expeditions to the Chicxulub site. and to Belize K/Pg ejecta sites, which she discovered and are the subject of her MSc and PhD. She continues to search for new impact craters, and with her team, in 2017, reported on a possible crater near Cali, Colombia.

As a former lead Program Executive for NASA's New Frontiers Program she had oversight responsibility for the program. The New Frontier Program is currently composed of the mission New Horizons, Juno, OSIRIS ReX, and Dragonfly. She also was the Program Executive of the Discovery Program Lucy mission Lucy Mission the first mission to explore the Trojans asteroids. Ocampo was the Program Executive of the Juno mission to Jupiter Juno Mission. and New Horizons mission to Pluto and the Kuiper Belt. She received NASA 'Exceptional Performance award , and the Woman of the Year in Science award from the Comisión Femenil in 1992. In 2002, she was named one of the most important women in science by the Discover magazine. To commemorate her contributions to space exploration, an asteroid was named after her.

== Early life and education ==
Adriana C. Ocampo Uria was born on January 5, 1955, in Barranquilla, Colombia. Her mother is Teresa Uria Ocampo, and her father is Victor Alberto Ocampo. Her family moved to Buenos Aires, Argentina, and then emigrated to Pasadena, California, in 1970, at the age of 14, where she was able to study physics and calculus. During high school, Ocampo was part of the Jet Propulsion Laboratory (JPL) troop 509. In 1973, while a junior in high school, she got a summer job at the JPL, where she analyzed images sent by the Viking spacecraft. In 1980, Ocampo (run)attained U.S. citizenship.

While still in high-school she continue her higher education in science at the Pasadena City College and later decided to follow a degree in aerospace engineering while participating in a Jet Propulsion Laboratory sponsored program entitle JPL Space Explorers Post 509. Ocampo then transferred to California State University, where she changed her major to planetary geology influence by the amazing data from the Viking mission. Ocampo earned her B.S. degree in geology from California State University, Los Angeles in 1983 while working at the Jet Propulsion Laboratory. In 1983, after graduation, she accepted a full-time job at there as a research scientist. She earned her Master in Science. degree in planetary geology from California State University, Northridge, in 1997, and she finished her Ph.D. at the Vrije Universiteit in Amsterdam.

== NASA career ==
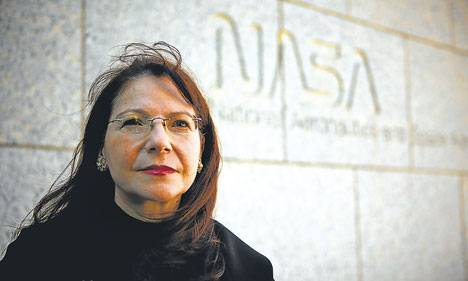
Adriana Ocampo

Adriana Ocampo started in 2015 to serve as the lead program executive for the New Frontiers Program at the Jet Propulsion Laboratory. The New Frontiers Program mission is to take the top priorities and goals of the planetary scientific community and address them employing medium-class spacecraft missions that furthers the understanding of the Solar System. These include the Juno mission to Jupiter, the New Horizons mission to Pluto and the asteroid sample return mission OSIRIS-REx. She was also the lead NASA scientist in their collaboration with the European Space Agency's Venus Express mission, and with the Japanese Aerospace Exploration Agency's Venus Climate Orbiter mission. Ocampo has had an asteroid name after her in recognition of her contributions to space exploration.

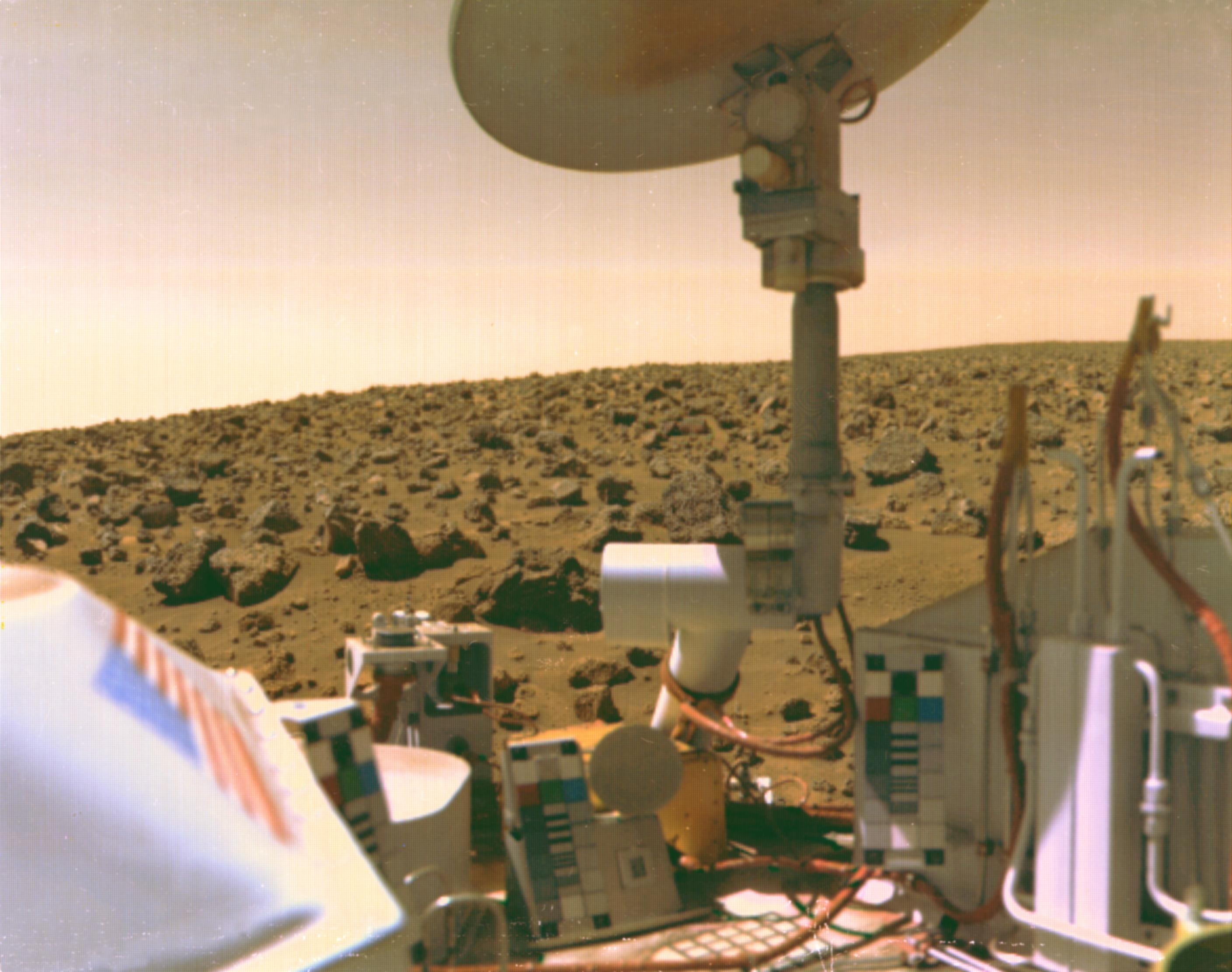
Mars landscape from Viking 2

Adriana Ocampo worked in a multi-mission image processing laboratory culminating in a publication in 1980. She was a member of the imaging team for the Viking program where she planned, analyzed, and produced images of Mars' satellites Phobos and Deimos, published by NASA in 1984 and later utilized to plan the Soviet Phobos mission. During this mission the team detected 100 kilometres (62 mi) down through the dense atmosphere of Venus. This was particularly useful to study the "night side" of Venus. Consequently, the team of scientists constructed the night-side maps of Venus, with resolutions 3 to 6 times better than those of Earth-based telescopes.

The Chicxulub impact crater is located underneath the Yucatán Peninsula in Mexico. It was hypothesized that this crater was formed by an asteroid leading to mass extinctions on Earth. This was previously postulated in the early 1980s by the physicist Luis Walter Alvarez and his son the geologist Walter Alvarez. However, the only evidence to back this theory was the presence of iridium in the K/T boundary, since this element was found to be mainly present in asteroids and comets. While looking for water resources in Yucatán using satellite images in 1989 and 1990, Ocampo, former NASA archaeologist Kevin O. Pope, and Charles Duller, found cenotes related to this crater. Adriana Ocampo and her colleagues hypothesized that the cenote might be near the impact site, and their findings were later published in Nature in May 1991. In 1991, NASA and The Planetary Society Pasadena sponsored an expedition led by Ocampo and Pope. During this expedition, Ocampo and her colleges discovered two new sites containing two layers consisting of particles that had been ejected upon impact of the asteroid and then flowed away, generating ejecta lobes. The ejecta lobes at Chicxulub are key to understanding Mars better, since most of that planet is covered by ejecta. Ocampo was awarded her master thesis on the Chicxulub impact crater at California State University.

The Exobiology Program of NASA's Office of Space Science and The Planetary Society of Pasadena sponsored an expedition to the second ejecta site in Belize. Ocampo led expeditions there in January 1995, 1996, and 1998. Small particles resembling green glass, and later identified as tektites, were found at the site. These particles, formed from exposure to high temperatures like the ones generated during the impact, linked this site to other ejecta sites in the Caribbean and Mexico.

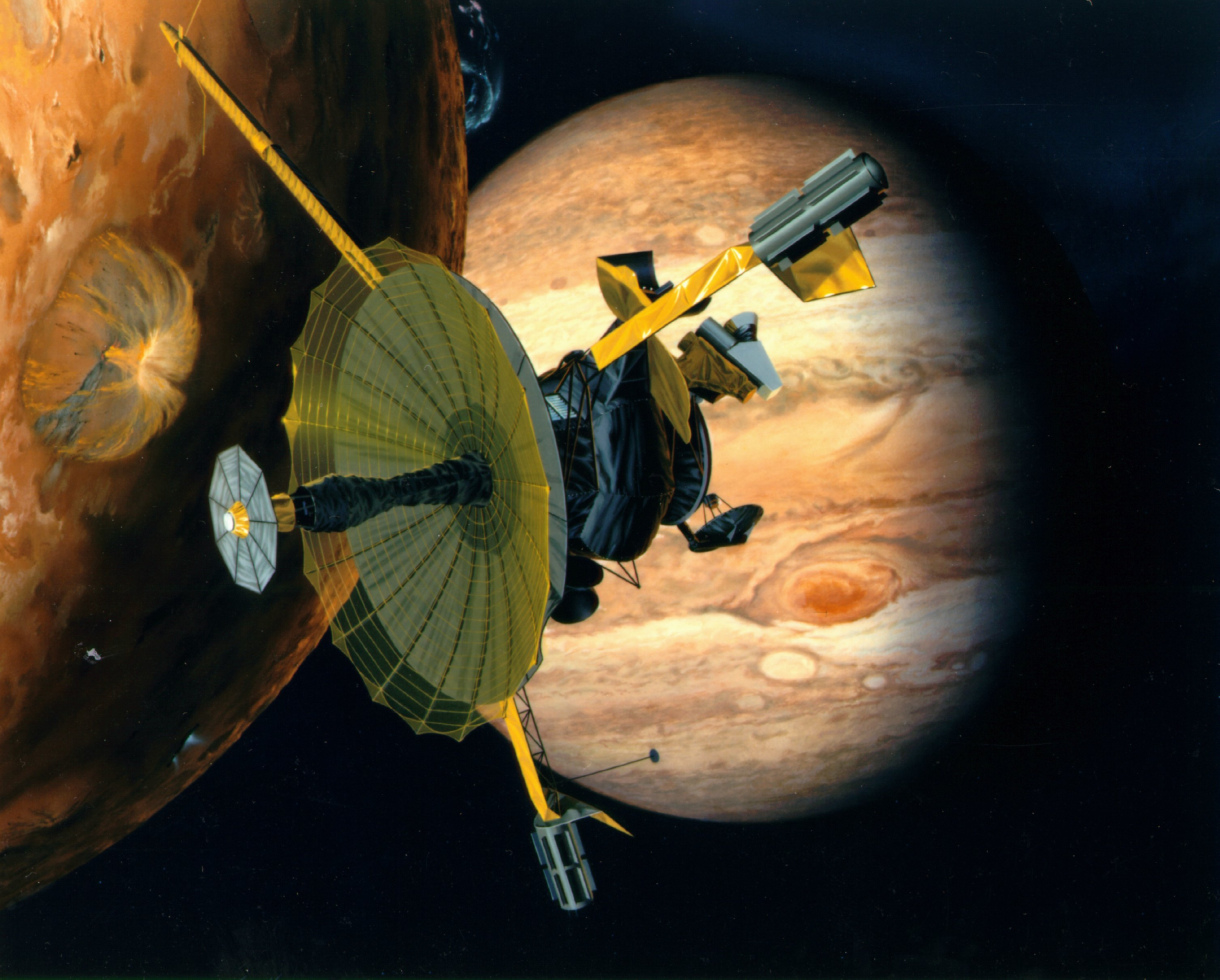
Artist's concept of Galileo at Io with Jupiter in the background; the high-gain antenna is fully deployed

In 2005, Ocampo was a member of the Galileo mission's team . She led of the near-infrared mapping spectrometer (NIMS), on Galileo's project, acting as the science coordinator for flight project mission operations. Galileo was launched in 1989 in route to Jupiter, bearing four remote-sensing instruments, one of them being NIMS. Ocampo was in charge of scheduling the observations of Jupiter's moon Europa, and leading the data analysis. Adriana Ocampo and her colleges published the results of this study in the Icarus journal titled "Galileo's Multiinstrument Spectral View of Europa's Surface Composition".

Ocampo led the Juno mission which was in charge of developing strategic plans and recommendations for the research of Jupiter. Juno is the first spacecraft built with solar panels with a span exceeding 8 metres (26 ft).

== Honors and awards ==
Ocampo received the Woman of the Year Award in Science from the Comisión Femenil in Los Angeles in 1992. She also received the Advisory Council for Women Award at JPL in 1996 and the Science and Technology Award from the Chicano Federation in 1997.

In 2002, Ocampo was named one of the 50 Most Important Women in Science by the science magazine Discover.

Asteroid 177120 Ocampo Uría, discovered by American astronomer Marc Buie at the Kitt Peak National Observatory in 2003, was named after Adriana Ocampo.

In March 2022, Ocampo was honored at the Latin America Lifetime Awards virtual ceremony for her inspiring legacy as a scientist.
