= Inauguration of Theodore Roosevelt =

Inauguration of Theodore Roosevelt may refer to:

- First inauguration of Theodore Roosevelt, an intra-term inauguration held in 1901 after the assassination of William McKinley
- Second inauguration of Theodore Roosevelt, a regular scheduled inauguration held in 1905
- Second inauguration of William McKinley, in which he inaugurated as vice president in 1901
