= Nord and Bert Couldn't Make Head or Tail of It =

1987 interactive fiction game

- Developer: Infocom
- Publisher: Infocom
- Designer: Jeff O'Neill
- Engine: Z-machine
- Platforms: Amiga, Apple II, Atari ST, Commodore 64, MS-DOS, Mac
- Release: July 22, 1987
- Genre: Interactive fiction
- Mode: Single-player

Nord and Bert Couldn't Make Head or Tail of It is an interactive fiction video game written by Jeff O'Neill and published by Infocom in 1987. It was released simultaneously for Amiga, Apple II, Atari ST, Commodore 64, MS-DOS, and Mac. Nord and Bert is unique among Infocom games in that it presents wordplay puzzles. It was Infocom's twenty-seventh game.

== Plot ==
Each chapter of Nord and Bert is dedicated to a different style of wordplay. The first seven chapters can be played in any order, since each exists as an independent "short story" unrelated to the other chapters; to begin the eighth, however, the player must provide seven "passwords" provided by completing each of the other sections.

The only effort made to interlink the separate parts of the game is as follows: reality has somehow been altered around the town of Punster. Idioms and clichés are suddenly manifesting themselves quite literally, and it falls to the player, as it always does, to sort things out.

The sections of the game:

- "The Shopping Bizarre" - this portion takes place in a grocery store where normal products have been replaced by outlandish homonyms. The player must change all the oddities back to their original form by simply typing the correct names. For instance, when confronted with a large, awkward-looking mammal sporting hooves and antlers that smells of fudge, the player must type "chocolate mousse" (a homonym for "moose").
- "Playing Jacks" - this section is rather short and unfocused, and involves a gadget called the "Jack of All Traits" (which is, of course, a play on the phrase "Jack of all trades"). When presented with a series of unusual situations, this item proves useful by displaying attributes of other items whose name contains "Jack". For instance, when a mermaid tangled in fishing line washes ashore, the player can turn the Jack of All Traits into a Jackknife and cut the lines.
- "Buy the Farm" - this chapter takes place around a farm and requires the player to use a variety of clichéd expressions literally, for instance BEAT SWORDS INTO PLOWSHARES or BUY A PIG IN A POKE.
- "Eat Your Words" - another section of idioms presented literally, this time revolving around a diner. The player must alternately insult and apologize to a waitress by using phrases such as GIVE THE WAITRESS THE EVIL EYE or EAT HUMBLE PIE. When the waitress is sufficiently exasperated, she allows the player to enter the kitchen, where the chef is murderously hostile until the player "leaves the cook to his own devices" and "gores his ox".
- "Act the Part" - the player must take part in a 50s-style sitcom and perform visual gags and bits of slapstick comedy, including giving someone a "hotfoot" and playing along with knock-knock jokes.
- "Manor of Speaking" - this chapter takes place in a house filled with bizarre rooms. Although this section has several puzzles reminiscent of Infocom's "straightforward" interactive fiction games, they are played for surreal humor. As an example: a room called The Kremlin has a talking portrait of Karl Marx. The player must wind a clock and place it inside a box, and then enter the Kremlin. The portrait of Marx assumes that the ticking box is a bomb and falls off the wall, revealing a safe which can be opened using the clock's "winding" key.
- "Shake a Tower" - this section ties a number of situations into an absurd story using spoonerisms. The tangled phrase can be entered by itself, such as "pretty girl" for "gritty pearl". Sometimes certain actions must be performed first, such as feeding stones to set up the change from "fed rocks" to a "red fox".
- "Meet the Mayor" - the final chapter can only be played after the rest of the game has been successfully completed. Elements of many of the preceding sections are mixed here as the player tries to convince Punster's mayor to sign a law. Some puzzle solutions are phrases that are merely hinted at by the surroundings, such as "Possession is nine-tenths of the law" or "taking something under false pretenses."

== Release ==
The Nord and Bert packaging includes Home on the Range, a physical booklet of wordplay-themed cartoons drawn by Kevin Pope (who also illustrated the front and back of the game package). The cartoons illustrate several of the types of puzzles in the game, with each cartoon corresponding to a section of the game.

== Reception ==
Computer Gaming World described Nord and Bert as "a sophisticated game for mature people who like wordplay". Its reviewer did not enjoy Nord and Bert as much as the "more complete" previous Infocom games, stating that the game often did not accept seemingly valid word play responses. He suggested that the game might be used to teach word play to students. Compute! more favorably reviewed the game, praising its humor, the puzzles' creativity, and the fact that individual games could be finished in a brief period. Compute!'s Gazette also liked the wordplay, stated that the game "should appeal to most everyone", and especially recommended it to those who avoided other text adventures. Antic's reviewer was critical, stating "I cannot recommend this game" because puzzles could not be solved by logic alone. He concluded, "I give Infocom an A for originality but will spend my money on something else".
