= California Ethnic and Multicultural Archives =

US archival institution

- Davidson Library, UCSB campus
- 34.4141443694186°N 119.84301301265224°W
- Location: Santa Barbara, California, USA
- Type: Archives
- Established: 1988

Other information
- Affiliation: University of California, Santa Barbara
- Website: https://www.library.ucsb.edu/

California Ethnic and Multicultural Archives (CEMA) is an archival institution that houses collections of primary source documents from the history of minority ethnic groups in California. The documents, which include manuscripts, slide photographs, newspaper clippings, works of art, journals, film, sound recordings, and other ephemera, are housed in the special collections department of the UCSB Libraries at the University of California, Santa Barbara, where they are made accessible to researchers upon request. An effort is currently underway to make certain documents available online through the Online Archive of California.

== History ==
CEMA was founded in 1988 by Joseph A. Boissé and Salvador Güereña, both UCSB librarians. The library already had a substantial collection of primary and secondary-sources in the Colección Tloque Nahuaque, a library of Chicano studies materials, and the need for special resources to preserve and catalogue primary resources became apparent. The primary resources, which at that time consisted primarily of silkscreen posters from the Chicano art movement, were transferred from the ethnic and gender studies library to the department of special collections.

Güereña began the acquisition of other collections immediately, and today CEMA is the repository for over 100 collections from each of the four main ethnic groups in California: Latinos, Asian Americans, African American, and Native Americans, although Mexican American collections still outnumber collections from the other groups.

== Projects ==
In 2001, CEMA was selected by the Online Archive of California, an internet resource, to supply digital images of Chicano art from its extensive photographic collections as part of California's contribution to the Congressionally-mandated American Memory project to preserve and increase the accessibility of documents from American history. Since that time, CEMA has provided over 7,000 digital images for the project.

== Collections ==
CEMA's collections include the archives of artistic, political, and professional organizations, as well as the papers of individual artists, musicians, activists, and writers, many of whom were active in the Chicano, anti-war, and civil rights movements. Notable collections include:

Organizations

- Asian American Theater Company
- Black Panther Party (San Francisco Bay Area)
- Católicos por la Raza
- Centro Cultural de la Raza
- Comisión Femenil Mexicana Nacional
- Galería de la Raza
- Kearny Street Workshop
- MEChA
- REFORMA
- Royal Chicano Air Force
- Self Help Graphics & Art
- Teatro Campesino

Individuals

- Oscar Zeta Acosta
- Ana Castillo
- Iris Chang
- Frank Chin
- Ricardo Cruz
- Adelina García
- Lalo Guerrero
- Yolanda Lopez
- Miguel Méndez
- José Montoya
- Rini Templeton
- Don Tosti
- Maria Helena Viramontes
- Nellie Wong
