= First inauguration of Theodore Roosevelt =

5th United States intra-term presidential inauguration

First presidential inauguration of Theodore Roosevelt
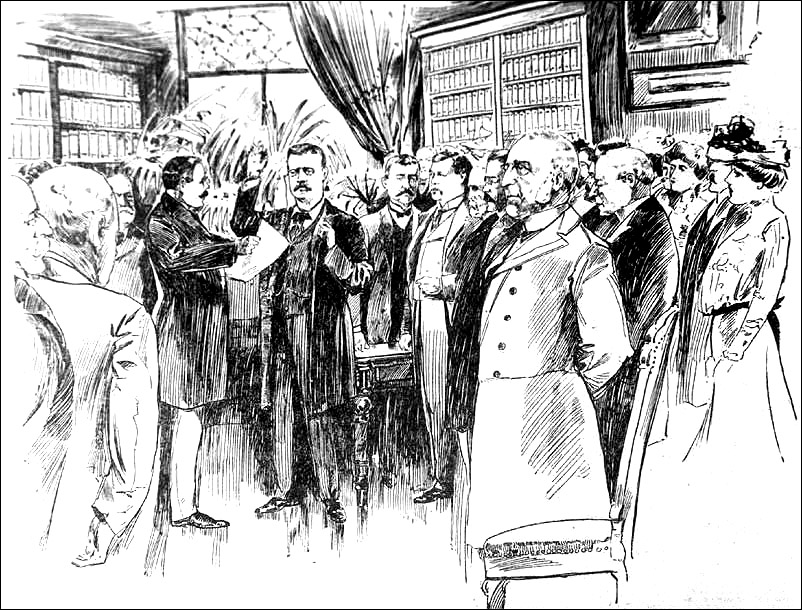
- Roosevelt being administered the oath of office as president after President McKinley's death, September 14, 1901.
- Date: September 14, 1901; 125 years ago
- Location: Ansley Wilcox House, Buffalo, New York
- Participants: Theodore Roosevelt; 26th president of the United States — Assuming office John R. Hazel; Judge of the United States District Court for the Western District of New York — Administering oath

The first inauguration of Theodore Roosevelt as the 26th president of the United States took place on Saturday, September 14, 1901, at the Ansley Wilcox House, at 641 Delaware Avenue in Buffalo, New York, following the death of President William McKinley earlier that day. The inauguration – the fifth non-scheduled, extraordinary inauguration to ever take place and the first in the 20th century – marked the commencement of the first term (a partial term of 3 years, 171 days) of Theodore Roosevelt as president. John R. Hazel, U.S. District Judge for the Western District of New York, administered the presidential oath of office. Aged 42 years and 322 days, Roosevelt was and currently is the youngest person to become president.

== Background ==
On September 6, Vice President Roosevelt had been at a luncheon of the Vermont Fish and Game League on Lake Champlain when he learned the news that McKinley had been shot. He rushed to Buffalo, but after being assured the president would recover, he went on a planned family camping and hiking trip to Mount Marcy in the Adirondacks. A week after the shooting, on the mountains, a runner notified him McKinley was on his death bed. Roosevelt pondered with his wife, Edith, how best to respond, not wanting to show up in Buffalo and wait on McKinley's death. Roosevelt was rushed by a series of stagecoaches to North Creek train station.

As written in a newspaper of the time:

When Colonel Roosevelt was reached and informed of the critical condition of the president he could scarcely believe the burden of the message personally delivered to him. Startled at the serious nature of the news, the vice president, at 5:45 o'clock immediately started back for the Tahawas Club. In the meantime the Adirondack stage line placed at his disposal relays of horses covering the thirty-five miles to North Creek. A deluging thunderstorm had rendered the roads unusually heavy. Without any delay he moved as rapidly as possible in the direction of North Creek, the northern terminus of the Adirondacks railroad, where his secretary, William Loeb, Jr., and Superintendent C. D. Hammond, of the Delaware and Hudson railway, with a special train, were awaiting his arrival. Soon after Colonel Roosevelt started night came on and rendered the trip exceedingly difficult and dangerous, as mile after mile was traveled in almost impenetrable darkness, but the expert guides piloted the vice president to his objective point.

At the station, Roosevelt was handed a telegram that said President McKinley died at 2:15 (September 14) that morning. The new president continued by train from North Creek to Buffalo. He arrived in Buffalo later that morning, accepting an invitation to stay at the home of Ansley Wilcox, a prominent lawyer and friend since the early 1880s when they had both worked closely with then-New York Governor Grover Cleveland on civil service reform.

== Ceremony ==
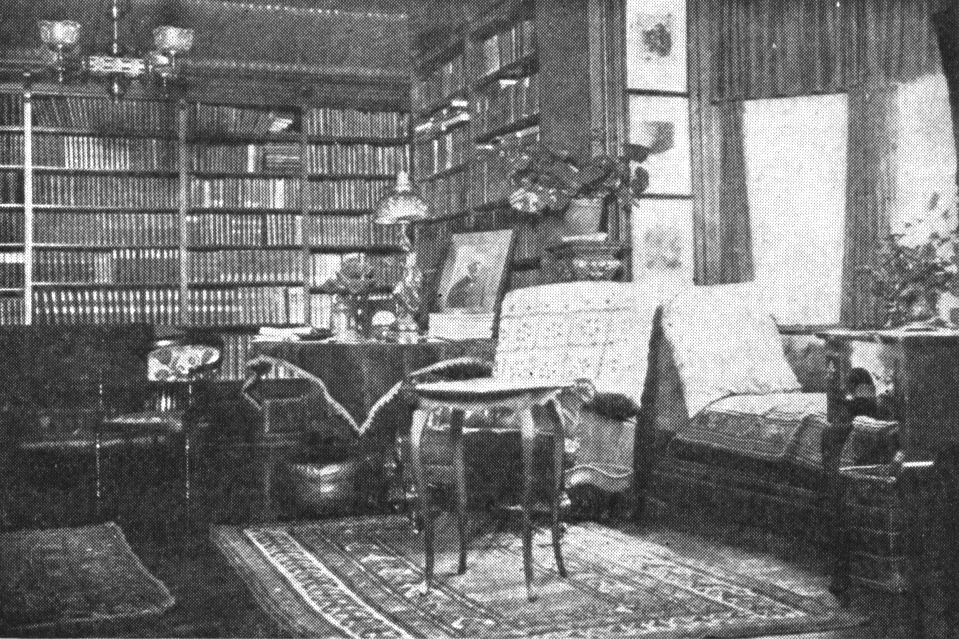
Interior of room in Wilcox House where Theodore Roosevelt took the presidential oath of office.

At 3:00 PM on the afternoon of September 14, several members of President McKinley's cabinet arrived at the Wilcox house (now known as the Theodore Roosevelt Inaugural National Historic Site). They were United States Secretary of War Elihu Root, Secretary of the Navy John D. Long, Attorney General Philander C. Knox, Secretary of the Interior Ethan Hitchcock, Postmaster General Charles Emory Smith, and Secretary of Agriculture James Wilson. With them were Judge Hazel, Judge Albert Haight of the New York Court of Appeals, and United States Senator from New York Chauncey Depew, among others. Roosevelt met with them informally in the Library and, at the last moment, the newspaper men were all let in, but were prohibited from taking any photographs. (Note: This was likely for safety reasons, as flash photography using the technology of the time in a lavishly decorated indoor setting was a serious fire hazard.) Then, when asked whether he was ready to take the oath, he answered, "I will take the oath. And in this hour of deep and terrible national bereavement, I wish to state that it shall be my aim to continue, absolutely without variance, the policy of President McKinley, for the peace and honor of our beloved country." After his response, Judge Hazel administered the oath.

== Reaction ==
Expressing the fears of many old-line Republicans, Mark Hanna lamented "that damned cowboy is president now."

== See also ==
- Presidency of Theodore Roosevelt
- Second inauguration of Theodore Roosevelt
- Theodore Roosevelt Inaugural National Historic Site
- Roosevelt–Marcy Trail
