= Comisión Femenil Mexicana Nacional =

Mexican American activist organization

- Abbreviation: CFMN
- Formation: 1970; 56 years ago
- Type: Nonprofit advocacy organization
- Purpose: Chicana rights

The Comisión Femenil Mexicana Nacional (National Mexican Women's Commission, CFMN) was a Mexican-American organization dedicated to economically and politically empowering Chicana women in the United States.

== Creation ==
CFMN was formed during the Mexican American National Issues Conference, in October 1970. With the help of leadership from Francisca Flores and Simmie Romero, a group of women spoke up about the issues pertaining to Chicanas because they felt as though their issues were not being prioritized in the conferences. The lack of prioritization of Chicana issues in the annual Mexican American National Issues Conferences was because it was issues of women, not men, the group of women believed. Therefore, the group of women decided to create an organization to address their issues without having to deal with, "the male sexism in the Chicano Movement or the racial discrimination in the Women's Movement".

== History ==
In 1972, CFMN created the Chicana Service Action Center in response to the need for training low-income, unskilled Chicana women.

In 1973, CFMN had a conference in Goleta, California. Topics such as education, childcare, sex education, and family planning were discussed. At this conference, the first constitution was drafted. In the draft they decided on the following terms: "to direct efforts to organizing women to assure leadership positions within the Chicano movement and in community life, to disseminate news and information regarding the work and achievement of Mexican and Chicana women, to concern themselves in promoting programs which specifically lend themselves to help, assist, and promote solutions to female issues, to spell out issues to support and explore ways to establish relationships with other women's organization". During this year, CFMN created Centros de Niños, a bilingual and bicultural childcare geared towards helping working and poor women in school or training.

In 1975, CFMN participated in the opposition of involuntary sterilization of Chicana women by filing a class action lawsuit, Madrigal V. Quilligan. However, they failed to stop the sterilization of Latina women but generated public outcry about the situation. The public outcry helped in creating bilingual consent forms and the enforcement of the 72-hour waiting period prior to performing operation. During this year, CFMN attended United Nations International Decade of the Woman's Year Conference in Mexico City.

In 1977, CFMN attended the National Women's Conference in Houston, Texas. At the conference CFMN was recognized as "the leading Latina Organization in the United States".

In 1978, members attended the National ERA March in Washington, D.C. There, members lobbied for the expansion of the Equal Right Amendment, all the while actively asking Chicanas to take action in decision-making processes.

In 1985, CFMN organized 23 chapters. The founded Casa Victoria, "a residential treatment program for adolescent girls who have been involved in the juvenile justice system. The program provided bilingual counseling, family therapy, education and vocational training, and positive role models as well as positive alternatives to incarceration". CFMN also created a newsletter, La Mujer. This year, CFMN also stopped holding national conferences. Business meetings, however, continued to be held for another decade.

== Current status ==
In 2000, the CFMN's archives were established at the California Ethnic and Multicultural Archives (CEMA) of UCSB's Davidson Library.

Although CFMN organization no longer exists, CFMN continues to have an active California Chapter. Comisión Femenil of the San Fernando Valley is the longest-standing active chapter. Established in the early 1990s, Comisión Femenil of the San Fernando Valley annually holds its Adelante Mujer Latina Career Conference. This one-day conference strives to engage, encourage, and inform high school Latinas about college. Participants are presented with career workshops led by professional Latinas, most of whom are from the same neighborhoods as the attendees. A college and resource fair is also a large part of this conference. Keynote speakers have included Dolores Huerta and Catherine Sandoval. Ana Guerrero was scheduled to speak at the 22nd Annual Adelante Mujer Latina Career Conference on March 21, 2015 at California State University, Northridge. They continue to support Latinas through scholarships, higher education and career options, professional development and career options, and community involvement.

Centro de Niños also continues to expand across Southern, California, specifically Los Angeles. It continues to serve poor working mothers by helping child development in the community.

== Presidents ==
Francisca Flores: 1970-1972
Josephine Valdez Banda: 1972-1973
Anita Ramos: 1973-1974
Yolanda Nava: 1974-1975
Gloria Molina: 1975-1977
Sandra Serrano Sewell: 1977-1979
Christine Fuentes: 1979-1980
Gloria Moreno-Wycoff: 1980-1981
Leticia Quezada: 1981-1982
Angie Cisneros: 1982-1983
Beatriz Olvera-Stotzer: 1983-1985
Carmen Cantu: 1985-1987
Carmen E. Luna: 1987-1989
Magdalena Cervantes: 1989-1991
Desiree Portillo-Rabinov: 1991-1994
Nina Sorkin: 1994-1996
Julia Vera-Andrews: 1996-2000

== See also ==
- 1977 National Women's Conference
- Equal Rights Amendment
- Madrigal v. Quilligan
- National Organization for Women
