= Linda Vallejo =

American artist (born 1951)

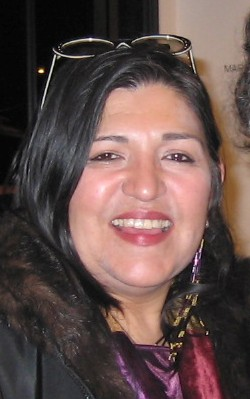
- Born: 1951 (age 74–75); East Los Angeles
- Education: Whittier College; California State University, Long Beach
- Movement: Chicano Art Movement
- Spouse: Ron Dillaway
- Awards: COLA Individual Artist Fellowship, Durfee Foundation Completion grant, California Community Foundation
- Website: lindavallejo.com

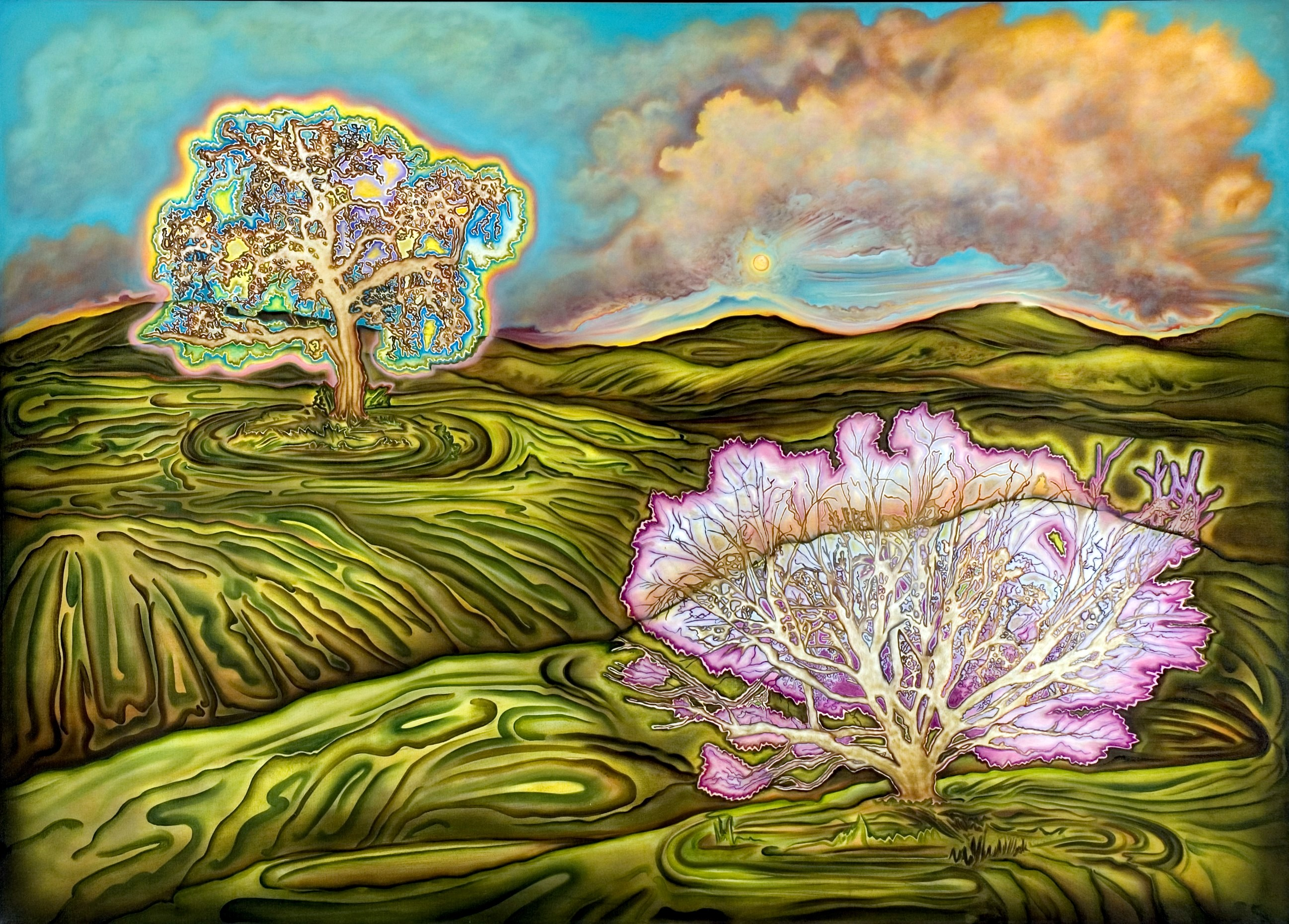
Linda Vallejo. "Electric Oaks on the Hillside." 60 x 84 in. Oil on canvas. 2007

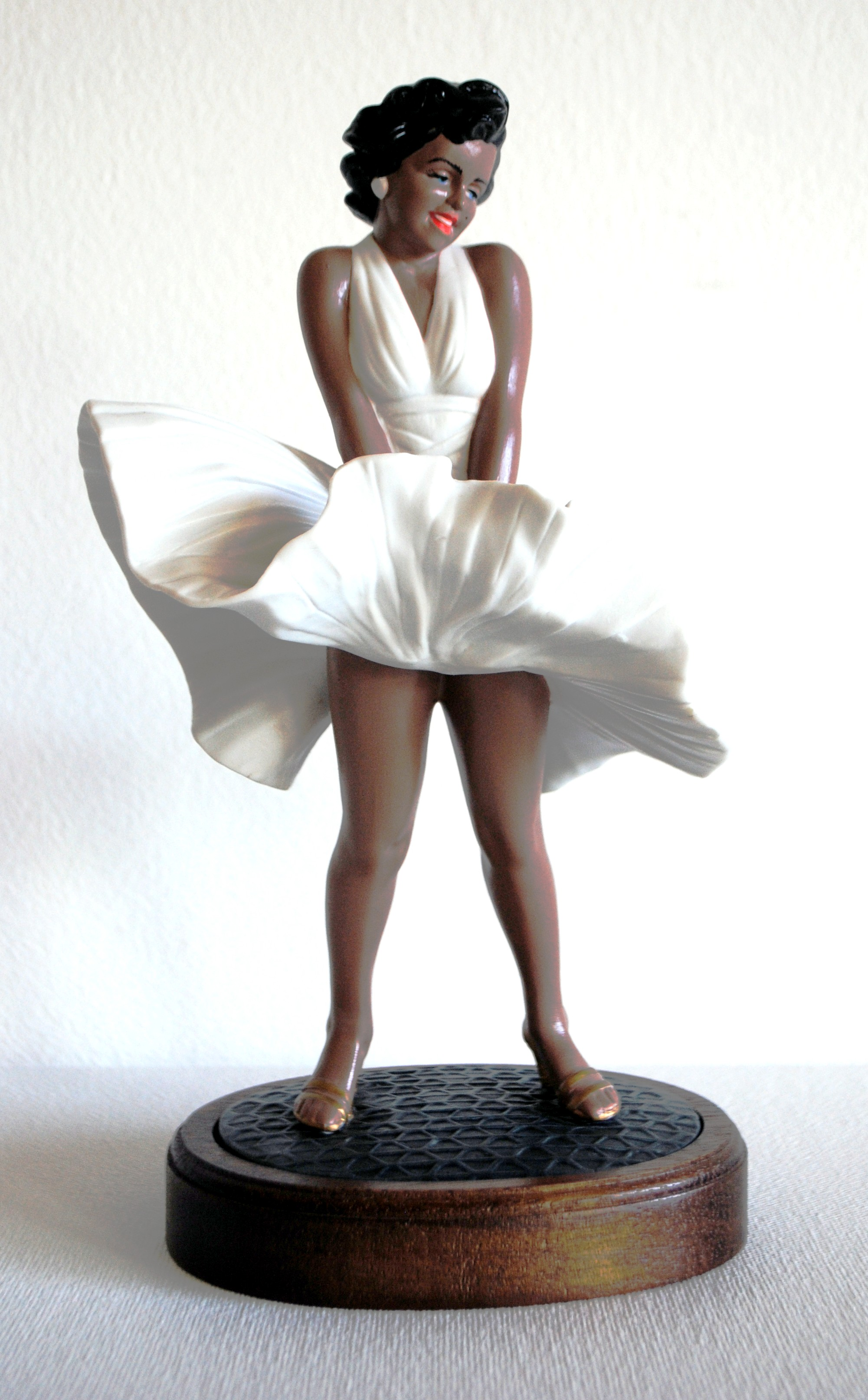
Linda Vallejo. "Marielena La Fabulosa." 8.5" x 5" x 4.5". Repurposed porcelain figurine and acrylic. Collection of William Goodman

Linda Vallejo (born 1951 in East Los Angeles) is an American artist known for painting, sculpture and ceramics. Her work often addresses her Mexican-American ethnic identity within the context of American art and popular culture. The founder of the commercial art gallery Galería Las Américas, she is also an arts educator and has been involved in traditional Native American and Mexican rituals and ceremonies for many years.

Vallejo's work was included in three exhibitions organized as part of the Getty-sponsored "Pacific Standard Time: Art in Los Angeles 1945-1980"- "Doin' It in Public: Feminism and Art at the Woman's Building," Otis College of Art and Design; "Breaking in Two: Provocative Visions of Motherhood," Santa Monica Arena 1; and "Mapping Another LA: The Chicano Art Movement," UCLA Fowler Museum.

== Biography ==
Linda Vallejo was born in East Los Angeles. Her father entered the United States Air Force as a commissioned officer and frequently moved the family. Vallejo received a Bachelor of Arts degree in Fine Arts from Whittier College in 1973, studied lithography at the University of Madrid, Spain, and earned a Master of Fine Arts degree from California State University, Long Beach in 1978.

Vallejo lives in Topanga, California, with her husband Ron Dillaway, whom she married in 1977. She has two sons, Robert and Paul.

In 1973, Vallejo was one of the early art teachers at Self-Help Graphics Barrio Mobile Art Studio, an arts non-profit primarily serving the Latino community of Los Angeles with arts education, printmaking and support. Over the years, she participated in numerous exhibitions at Self-Help Graphics.

Her latest offering is an online grant writing course called A to Z Grantwriting. A to Z Grantwriting was established in 1985 with a 3-hour grantwriting class taught through the Learning Annex adult evening classes. In 1995 Ms. Vallejo expanded this workshop to create the A to Z Grantwriting Online Course, a 12 lesson / six-week on-line course with hundreds of resources, tools, samples, and examples. It includes free online writing resources for grantwriters or arts professionals who want to learn how to write a grant.

== Art ==
Vallejo's early works address symbolism of indigenous traditions of Mexico and the Americas through the genre of painting. In many of these works, she used surrealism to create a sense of a dream-state in her paintings. Many of her works were motivated by "dreams and premonitions."

After purchasing a Dick and Jane primer at a thrift store, she got the idea to change their skin color. Around 2010, she began appropriating American pop icons like Mickey, Minnie Mouse, Cinderella, Fred Flintstone, Barney Rubble, Elvis Presley(El Vis), Marilyn Monroe (Marielena), historical figures such as Marie Antoinette and Louis-Auguste, and numerous American presidents, presenting them all as Mexicans with tanned skin (sometimes with tattoos) in her series titled "Make 'Em All Mexicans."

In 2014, Chicano Studies scholar Karen Mary Davalos presented the paper "Linda Vallejo: An Arc of Indigenous Spirituality and Indigenist Sensibility" at the Roundtable of Latina Feminism at John Carroll University. Davalos first presented this paper at the Third Biennial National Conference of Latino Art Now in 2010. Davalos notes, “From one perspective, Vallejo has stolen, denied, and suppressed white representational power, and with a brush stroke, she has recoded it brown. Vallejo’s [Make'Em All Mexican] series is quietly disorienting, fiercely defies closure, and invokes uncertainty. Viewers have the sense that Vallejo is not yet finished with her social critique. Racial coding, she reminds us, is only skin-deep.”

In 2016, she reprised "Make 'Em All Mexican" at the request of UCLA Film Professor Chon Noriega. By "brown-washing" Hollywood celebrities Cate Blanchett(Catarina Blancarte), Ben Affleck and Matt Damon (Mateo y Bernardo), Audrey Hepburn (Aurora Hernandez), Marilyn Monroe (Marielena), and Oscar statues (supposedly modeled after Mexican Emilio Fernandez), they suddenly became starlets of Mexican descent, which attracted a lot of press in light of the ongoing #OscarsSoWhite campaign. Regarding this body of work, Marlene Donohue observes, "The exaggerated cliches here seem deliberate, designed to remind us that however much myriad identities/realities are marketed both in academia and consumer culture as the new 'post-race' norm, the ideology of racial domination continues."

She is included in the encyclopedic L.A. Rising: SoCal Artists Before 1980.

== Exhibitions ==
Vallejo's work has been included in well over 100 group exhibitions and she has had over twenty solo exhibitions in museums, city galleries, and commercial spaces in Arizona, California, Colorado, Illinois, Iowa, New Mexico, New York, Texas, Washington, D.C. as well as Mexico and Spain. Her work was featured in three touring exhibitions "Chicano Art: Resistance and Affirmation"(1990-1993), "El Gran Mexico: Shared Border Spaces"(2014-2015), and "My Hero: Contemporary Art & Superhero Action"(2016-2018). Vallejo's work was the subject of both "Fierce Beauty: A Forty-Year Retrospective Exhibition"(2010), organized by the Boat House Gallery at the Plaza de la Raza Cultural Center for Arts and Education in Los Angeles, California; and "Make 'Em All Mexican," a 2011 solo exhibition curated by Chicano Studies scholar Dr. Karen Mary Davalos for Avenue 50 Studio, which traveled through 2015 to museums, including Fresno Art Museum, Robert and Frances Fullerton Museum of Art, and Lancaster Museum of Art and History, and commercial galleries in California and Illinois.

== Collections ==
Vallejo's work is included in the collections of the Carnegie Museum, Oxnard, California; Los Angeles County Museum of Art, Los Angeles, California; National Museum of Mexican Art, Chicago, Illinois; California Ethnic and Multicultural Archives (CEMA), University of California, Santa Barbara, California; and UCLA Chicano Studies Research Center, Los Angeles, California.

== Quotes ==
"I don't believe a healthy human culture can be sustained by destroying nature. We need to integrate our relationship with nature as we have done so readily with machines and war. There are responsibilities that accompany life, both in art and in the natural world."-Linda Vallejo (2002)

"Today Make 'Em All Mexican is a satire, but it's also a peek into the future," given that well over half of all California public students are Latino.-Linda Vallejo (2016)
