= Ansley Wilcox =

American scholar (1856–1930)

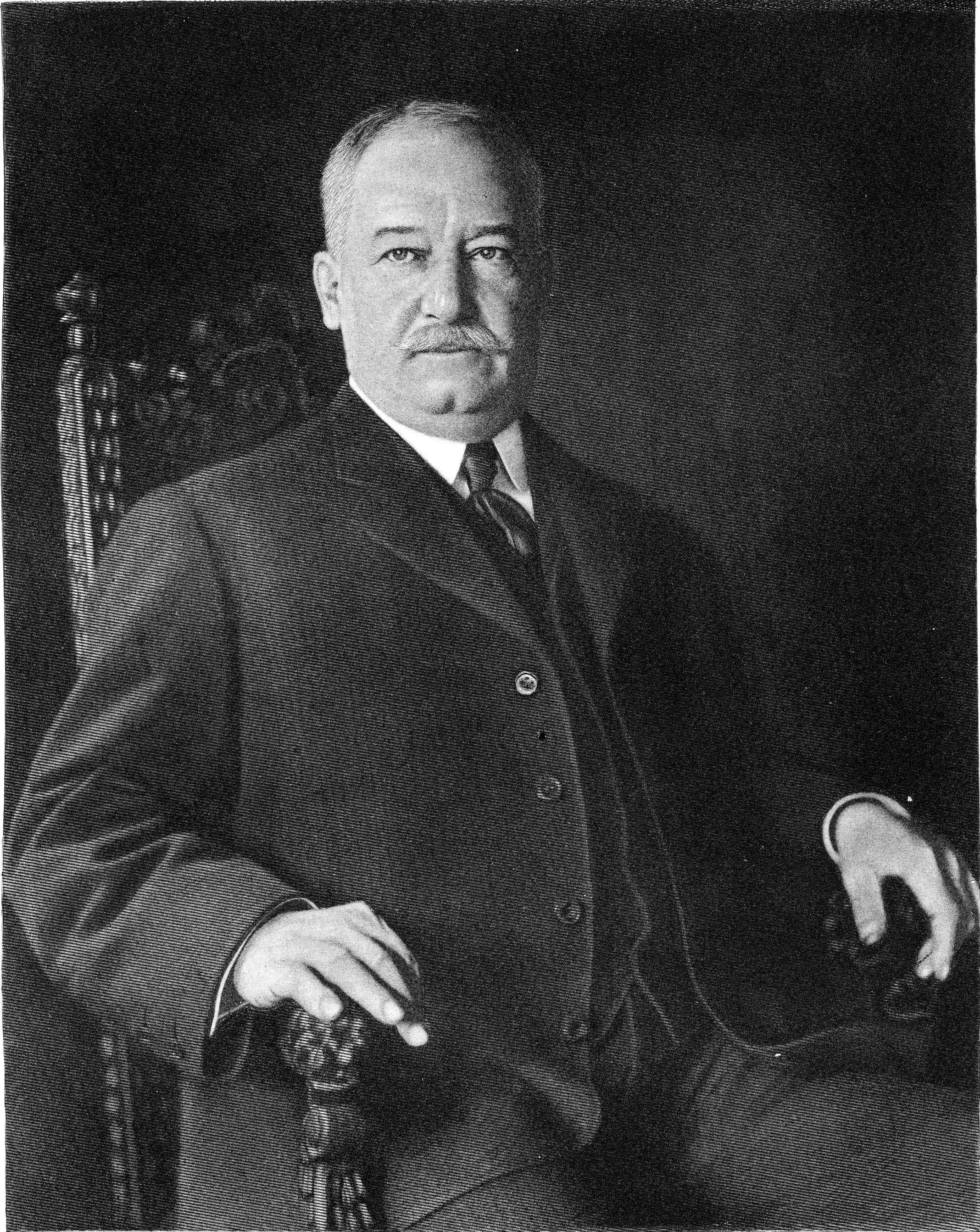
- Born: January 27, 1856; Augusta, Georgia, U.S.
- Died: January 26, 1930 (aged 73); Buffalo, New York, U.S.
- Resting place: Forest Lawn Cemetery
- Education: Hopkins School
- Alma mater: Yale University; Oxford University
- Occupations: Lawyer, scholar, civil service reform commissioner
- Spouses: Cornelia Rumsey (m. 1878; died 1880) Mary G. Rumsey (m. 1883)
- Children: Nina Wilcox; Frances Wilcox

Signature
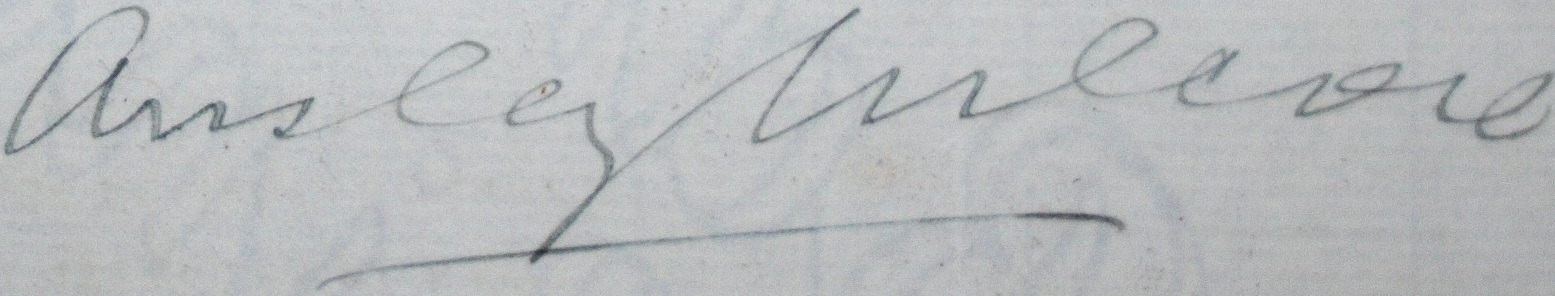

Ansley Wilcox (January 27, 1856 – January 26, 1930) was an American scholar, Oxford graduate, prominent lawyer, civil service reform commissioner, New York political insider and friend of Theodore Roosevelt. After the assassination of William McKinley, on September 14, 1901, Vice President Roosevelt was sworn in as 26th president of the United States in the library of Wilcox's home at 641 Delaware Avenue in Buffalo, New York.

== Early life ==
Ansley Wilcox was born in Summerville, Augusta, Georgia, on January 27, 1856, to Frances Louisa (née Ansley) and Daniel H. Wilcox. Wilcox's mother was from the South and his father from the North. During the Civil War his family moved to Connecticut. Wilcox attended preparatory school at the Hopkins School before attending Yale, where he ultimately studied law. After graduating from Yale in 1874, Wilcox traveled to London where he attended Oxford University for one year. He was then admitted to the bar.

== Career ==
=== Legal career ===
After leaving Oxford, Wilcox moved to Buffalo, New York, where he began practicing law. He was connected with the law firms Crowley, Movius & Wilcox; Allen, Movius, & Wilcox; Movius & Wilcox; Wilcox & Miner and Wilcox & Bull. He served as counsel for the commission acquiring land for the Niagara Falls Reservation from 1883 to 1885. He was chair of medical jurisprudence at the University of Buffalo.

In 1890, Wilcox was involved in the case of Rogers v. The Common Council of the City of Buffalo that established the constitutionality of the Civil Service Law.

In 1891, Wilcox took the landmark case of Briggs v. Spaulding to the Supreme Court and with it, established the liability for negligence of directors of national banks. The case, which was decided on May 25, 1891, involved the First National Bank of Buffalo and its directors, Reuben Porter Lee, Francis E. Coit, Elbridge G. Spaulding, William H. Johnson, and Thomas W. Cushing. The case was brought by Anne Vought as executrix of John H. Vought, and Frank S. Coit and Joseph C. Barnes, as administrators of Charles C. Coit, former directors.

Wilcox was a member of the Reservation Commission from 1910 until his retirement from the practice of law in 1917.

=== Roosevelt swearing in ceremony in the Wilcox home ===
Wilcox met Theodore Roosevelt in the early 1880s when they were appointed by then Gov. Grover Cleveland to a special commission on civil service reform. Both men also served on the commission to create the Niagara Reservation, a protected park area around Niagara Falls, with Wilcox serving as counsel for the commission from 1883 to 1885. Wilcox was credited and honoured throughout the reservation as one of the foremost figures in the reservation's creation as someone determined to save the gorge overlooking Niagara falls from factories and mills. Wilcox persuaded the state legislature to appropriate $1,500,000 for the creation of the Niagara State park which by the 1920s was the single most famous park in the country. Wilcox's involvement in the park ended after prolonged legal battle with Robert Moses concerning the administration of the reservation. Moses aimed to commandeer the Niagara commission, which Wilcox chaired, in order to garner more power for himself as head of the New York Department for Parks. Moses wrongly and maliciously accused Wilcox of corrupt practices concerning Wilcox's method of garnering assistance from Paul A. Schoellkopf, head of the Niagara Falls Power Company to purchase parcels of land when they went up for sale so they could be ensured for park use. In the midst of this legal battle Wilcox was forced to resign due to his waning health leaving the door open for Moses to take power over the Niagara commission by appointing his recommended replacement for Wilcox's position as chair. During Moses reign as State Parks council chairman Moses systematically removed every plaque mentioning Wilcox's contribution to the park and replaced them with plaques bearing Mose's name leaving the impression Mose's was the visionary who brought the park to life, not Wilcox and the Niagara commission.

On September 6, 1901, while attending the Pan-American Exposition, anarchist Leon Czolgosz twice shot President William McKinley. McKinley's Vice President, Theodore Roosevelt, was in Isle la Motte, Vermont when word of the assassination attempt reached him. He hurried to Buffalo intending to stay at the Iroquois Hotel, however on his way inside he was stopped to speak to Ansley Wilcox who offered the vice president the use of his home on Delaware Ave. Early doctor's reports on the president's condition were positive, so much so that Roosevelt was encouraged to leave Buffalo as a show of confidence in the president's recovery. He resumed his planned schedule which included a family camping and hiking trip to Mount Marcy in the Adirondacks. On September 13, McKinley's condition worsened and word was sent to the vice president. By the time a runner finally caught up with him at the top of the mountain, the sun was beginning to set. Not wanting to simply show up in Buffalo and wait on McKinley's death, Roosevelt was pondering with his wife, Edith, how best to respond to this turn of events, when additional news reached him that McKinley would soon die. Roosevelt was rushed by a series of stagecoaches to North Creek train station. At the station, Roosevelt was handed a telegram that said only that the president had died at 2:15 am. Turning the telegram upside down and reading it again, Roosevelt expressed a sense of helplessness that the telegram contained no additional information and said only that McKinley had died at 2:15 am on the morning of the 14th. Officially having learned that he was now President of the United States, Roosevelt continued by train from North Creek to Buffalo. Roosevelt arrived in Buffalo later that same day, accepting an invitation to stay at Wilcox's home again. Wilcox would recall that "the family and most of the household were in the country, but he [Roosevelt] was offered a quiet place to sleep and eat, and accepted it."

For the actual swearing in, the most appropriate site was determined to be the Wilcox home. Approximately 50 dignitaries, family members and six of the eight cabinet members gathered in the front library for the inauguration. Federal judge John R. Hazel administered the oath, borrowing Wilcox's morning coat. No photograph image exists of the ceremony itself, although the room was heavily photographed after the inauguration had concluded. Today this home is known as the Ansley Wilcox House at Buffalo, New York. Roosevelt did not swear on the Bible nor on any other book, making him unique among presidents. Mark Hanna lamented that "that damned cowboy is president now," giving expression to the fears of many old line Republicans.

=== Politics ===
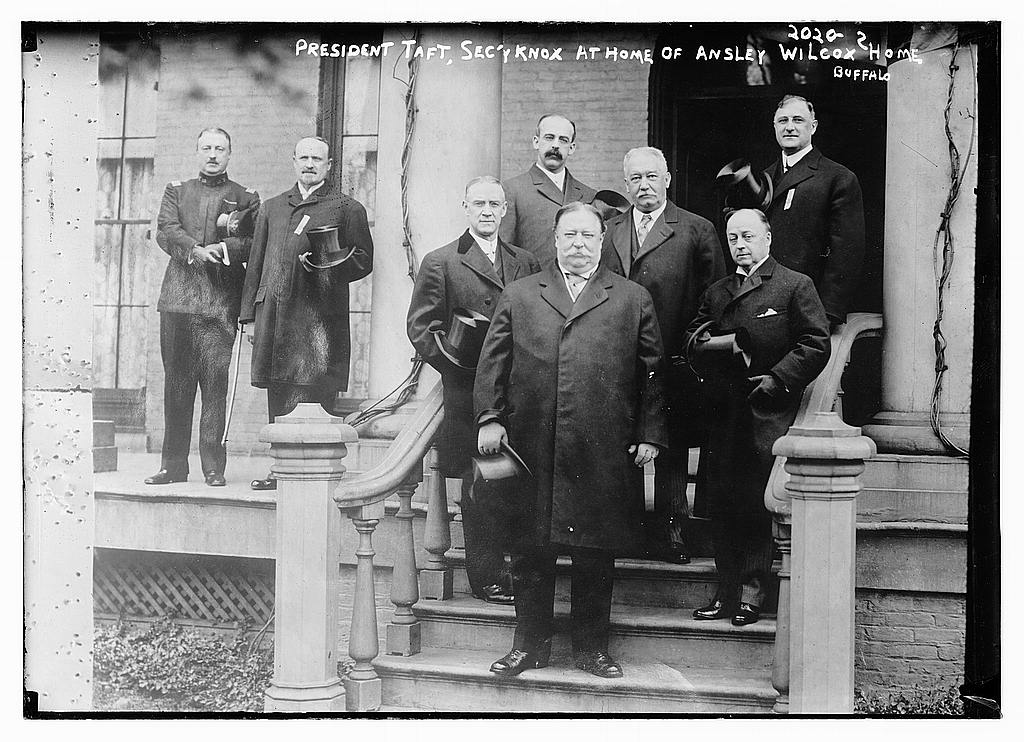
A visit of President William Howard Taft to Wilcox's Buffalo home in April 1910. Taft is seen front center, Philander C. Knox (right), and Wilcox (behind Taft to the right).

Though he never ran for public office, Wilcox was very interested in politics and was a friend of at least three presidents, Cleveland, Theodore Roosevelt and William Howard Taft. In the early 1890s, Wilcox first proposed the idea of holding local elections during odd numbered years to avoid conflict with state and federal elections during even numbered years and was adopted at the New York State Constitutional Convention of 1894. In 1884, Wilcox, an independent Republican, broke ranks and voted for Democrat Grover Cleveland in the presidential election. In 1904, he supported Theodore Roosevelt, but in the election of 1912, he threw his support to Republican incumbent Taft, rather than his old friend Roosevelt, who had left the Republican party and was running on the Progressive Party ticket.

== Personal life ==
While he was studying in England at Oxford, he met Cornelia C. Rumsey (1854-1880), a young woman from Buffalo on holiday with her family. After Oxford, he moved to Buffalo and married Cornelia on January 17, 1878. Cornelia's father, Dexter P. Rumsey (1827-1906), gave them a house at 675 Delaware Avenue as a wedding present. Cornelia died six weeks after giving birth to their daughter in 1880:

- Cornelia "Nina" Rumsey Wilcox (1880-1968), was a pioneer in body psychotherapy and a mentor to Stanley Keleman. She was first married to Henry Adsit Bull from 1901 until their divorce in 1916, and later to Lee Witt in 1921 until their divorce in 1923

On November 20, 1883, Ansley Wilcox married Cornelia’s younger sister, Mary G. Rumsey (1855-1933). Once again, Dexter Rumsey gave his daughter and son-in-law a house as a wedding present, this one at 641 Delaware Avenue. Their only child, a daughter:

- Frances Wilcox (b. 1884), who married Tom Cooke

Ansely Wilcox died of throat cancer on January 26, 1930, one day before his 74th birthday. He is buried in the Rumsey plot in Forest Lawn Cemetery.

=== Associations and civic activities ===
Wilcox founded the Charity Organization Society in 1877 and served as its president. He also founded the Fitch Crèche, the first day center for working mothers in the United States. Many of these groups met informally the Wilcox home to make decisions and plan events. He was also a founding member of the Wanakah Country Club and enjoyed riding his horses and polo ponies in Delaware Park. The garden at 641 Delaware was also one of his passions. Although a professional gardener was on staff, Wilcox often tended the flowers himself. He also served as president of the Civil Service Reform Association of Buffalo.

Wilcox was a member of the board of managers of the State Reformatory in Elmira in 1899. He was a trustee of the Buffalo General Hospital. He spent his time in charity work, golfing, riding and gardening. He also took a particular interest in the politics behind the development of the hydro-electric power plants in Niagara Falls in the 1920s.

=== Legacy ===
Today, the Wilcox house is the oldest part of a National Historic Site including the lone surviving structure from the Buffalo Barracks compound. Due to tensions between the U.S. and Anglo-Canada, a military post was constructed to ensure border security. Built in 1839, the post encompassed all the land from Allen Street to North Street and Delaware Ave to Main Street. The structure that would later be incorporated into the Theodore Roosevelt Inaugural National Historic Site started life in 1840 as the barracks' officers' quarters.
