= Católicos por La Raza =

Catholic anti-racist activist group

Católicos por La Raza (CPLR; lit. 'Catholics for the race') was a political association organized by Ricardo Cruz in the later 1960s in Los Angeles, California. Formed in the fall of 1969, Católicos por La Raza was made up of Chicano Catholic student activists who were engaged with both "their Catholic and Chicano heritage," enabling them to name and fight against racism in the Catholic Church and its effects on the community. The CPLR was concerned with the discrimination and hypocrisy of the church's institutional power and wealth, arguing that such should be "brought to bear in solving the current Chicano urban and rural crisis". CPLR sought to transform the Church into an institution for social change, creating projects focused on housing development, education, and small business development; believing that the Catholic Church in Los Angeles should use its power and wealth to address the economic and social needs of Mexican Americans.

== Criticisms of the Catholic Church ==
For the Católicos por La Raza, the Catholic Church's use of power and wealth exemplified a deep hypocrisy existing within the institution, with such wealth on one hand and such poverty on the other. The church was willing to continue to invest in extravagance while many of those in its faith were suffering. The CPLR released a statement claiming, "In a word, we are demanding that the Catholic Church practice what it preaches... And remember that the history of our people is the history of the Catholic Church in the Americas. We must return the Church to the poor. Or did Christ die in vain?" The CPLR was concerned that the Church continuing to abandon its Chicano population would lead to the next generation to view the church solely as an obstacle to their struggle for economic, political, and social independence. CPLR argued that the "religious dollar must be invested, without return expected, in the barrios."

== St. Basil's protests ==
Located on Wilshire Boulevard, just west of downtown Los Angeles, St. Basil's Church was considered a "magnificent statement of faith" when it was first constructed. Costing roughly 3.5 million dollars, the extravagant church quickly became an architectural pillar in the city. Growing discontent at the inequality expressed by the Church "took aim at the opulence, power, and three-million-dollar price tag of St. Basil's." CPLR saw the construction of St. Basil's as a clear demonstration of the Church's lack of concern with Mexican American struggles. Oscar Zeta Acosta referred to the building in The Revolt of the Cockroach People as a "monstrosity with a fantastic organ [that] pumps out a spooky religious hymn to this Christ Child of Golden Locks and Blue Eyes overlooking the richest drag in town". The church became the site of many of CPLR's demonstrations. In June 1969, at the church's dedication service, concerned Catholics protested outside, holding signs that read: "$1,000,000 for glass and stone, but for the poor ???"

On October 11, 1969, a group of Chicano students tried to see Cardinal James Francis McIntyre, but only Cruz and Joe Aragon were admitted. The cardinal reportedly treated Cruz and Aragon "like trash", and threatened to arrest the other CPLR members that had entered. Again, in December, many attempts were made to discuss the CPLR's demands with the cardinal, all of which were unsuccessful. A plan was made to peacefully disrupt the Christmas Eve Midnight Mass, organizing a list of demands for the Catholic Church that "included the use of church facilities for community work, for shared governance with religious leaders, housing and educational assistance, and for the development of healthcare programs." On December 24, 1969, Ricardo Cruz led a march of 300 people to St. Basil's, gathering outside and chanting "Que viva la raza" ('Long live the race') and "Catholics for the people". Aware that protestors were coming, the church locked its front doors, leading CPLR members to use the side entrances, where they were met by undercover county sheriffs posed as church ushers. "Chaos ensued" as the protesters were beaten and chased off the grounds by the sheriffs and church officials. Accounts of the event vary, and while images and personal testimony exemplify the brutality on the part of the sheriffs, the Los Angeles Times portrayed the protesters as a violent mob, using the headline "Club-Swinging Mob Breaks Into Church at Christmas Mass".

The following day the LAPD launched an investigation of the protest, resulting in the arrest of 21 CPLR activists charged with "disrupting a religious service". While the violence and arrests were a setback, the CPLR continued to conduct protests at St. Basil's. On December 29 a sympathizer, Bishop Parilla from Puerto Rico, celebrated mass in a dirt lot across the street from the church. From approximately January 1–4, protesters engaged in a hunger strike on the lawn of the church's property. On January 24, 1970, exactly one month after the Christmas Eve protest, students and other protesters conducted a midnight march from the downtown chancery to the church. The final protest at St. Basil's was on September 13, 1970, where Ricardo Cruz and some 20 other CPLR members burned their baptism certificates.

== Religion and the Chicano Movement ==
On February 11, 1970, El Grito del Norte published an article on the tension between the Chicano movement and the Church, commenting that "to build power among Mexican-Americans presents a threat to the Church; to demand reform of Anglo-controlled institutions stirs up dissension." The actions of the CPLR served as a larger class critique and "naming of the church's historic relationship to white supremacy." This naming refers to a long history of the intertwined relationship between the church and colonial rule. Historian Richard Martínez argues that "During the period between 1848 and 1960, the church effectively functioned as a partner in the colonization process by helping to maintain the racial and capitalist order in the Southwest."
