= Adelina Garcia =

American singer

Adelina Garcia (December 16, 1923 – 1999) was a Mexican-American or Chicana singer. She remains one of the most famous American singers of the bolero.

== Biography ==
Adelina Garcia was born in December 1923 in Phoenix, Arizona and moved as a child to Ciudad Juárez, Chihuahua, Mexico, where she first expressed interest in becoming a singer. Garcia spent most of her early childhood in that northern Mexican city, where she started to become famous by singing boleros at the XEP radio station. By the time she had reached her teenage years, she was well known across Chihuahua and other northern Mexican states.

In 1937, Garcia returned to Phoenix, but she did not stay there too long, establishing herself in Los Angeles at the age of fifteen. It was during that year that Garcia was signed by Columbia Records, a company that would release some of her albums and take her on a tour across the United States. In essence, she became a teen idol among Hispanic teenagers in the States.

Garcia expanded her celebrity to South America during the 1940s, touring Brazil and some other countries in that continent. In 1944, she had her first concert in Mexico City. In Mexico City, she participated at radio shows on the XEW station, which helped cement her fame in that country's non-northern states. Her participation at those shows also allowed her to become well known in Central America and the Caribbean. Garcia met composer and musician Gonzalo Curiel while in Mexico City. She and Curiel became friends and collaborators, and Curiel visited Brazil with Garcia many times after the pair met. In Brazil, Garcia made a number of albums for the Odeon label. Among Garcia's best known songs of the 1940s are "Muchachita" ("Young Girl"), "Vereda Tropical" ("Tropical River"), written, composed and originally sung by Mexican author Gonzalo Curiel, "Desesperadamente" ("Desperately") and "Mi Tormento" ("My Own Torment").

After touring heavily across the American Southwest and in California, Garcia re-settled in Los Angeles during 1955. She met musician Jose Heredia, whom she married and formed a family with. After marriage, Garcia decided to begin retiring. She started slowly, initially reducing her number of performances per year, until she stopped singing altogether.

In 1997, her musical and photo collection was bought by the CEMA, a repository of historic documents from California's ethnic history. The collection consists of fourteen recordings, photos, programs and other miscellaneous items about her life.

She is the mother of LA-based jazz and jazzrock drummer Joey Heredia, Freddy Heredia, and artist Angel Gustavo Garcia.
