= Second inauguration of Theodore Roosevelt =

30th United States presidential inauguration

Second presidential inauguration of Theodore Roosevelt
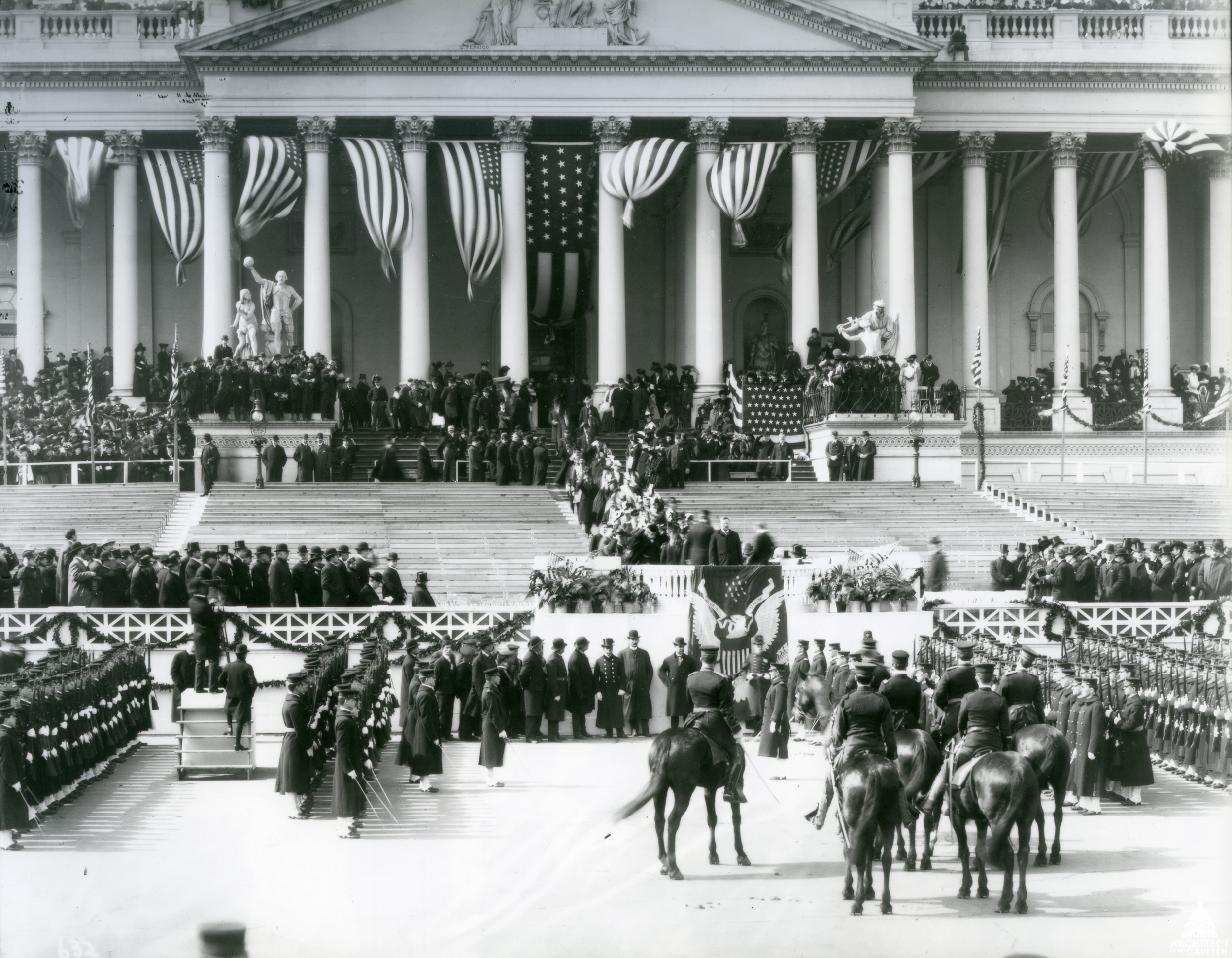
- Date: March 4, 1905; 121 years ago
- Location: United States Capitol, Washington, D.C.
- Organized by: Joint Congressional Committee on Inaugural Ceremonies
- Participants: Theodore Roosevelt; 26th president of the United States — Assuming office Melville Fuller; Chief Justice of the United States — Administering oath Charles W. Fairbanks; 26th vice president of the United States — Assuming office William P. Frye; President pro tempore of the United States Senate — Administering oath

The second inauguration of Theodore Roosevelt as president of the United States, took place on Saturday, March 4, 1905, at the East Portico of the United States Capitol in Washington, D.C. This was the 30th inauguration and marked the beginning of the second and eventually only full term of Theodore Roosevelt as president and the only term of Charles W. Fairbanks as vice president. Chief Justice Melville Fuller administered the presidential oath of office.

External videos
- Footage of Theodore Roosevelt's 1905 inauguration
- Theodore Roosevelt's Inaugural Ceremony, 1905

== Inaugural address ==
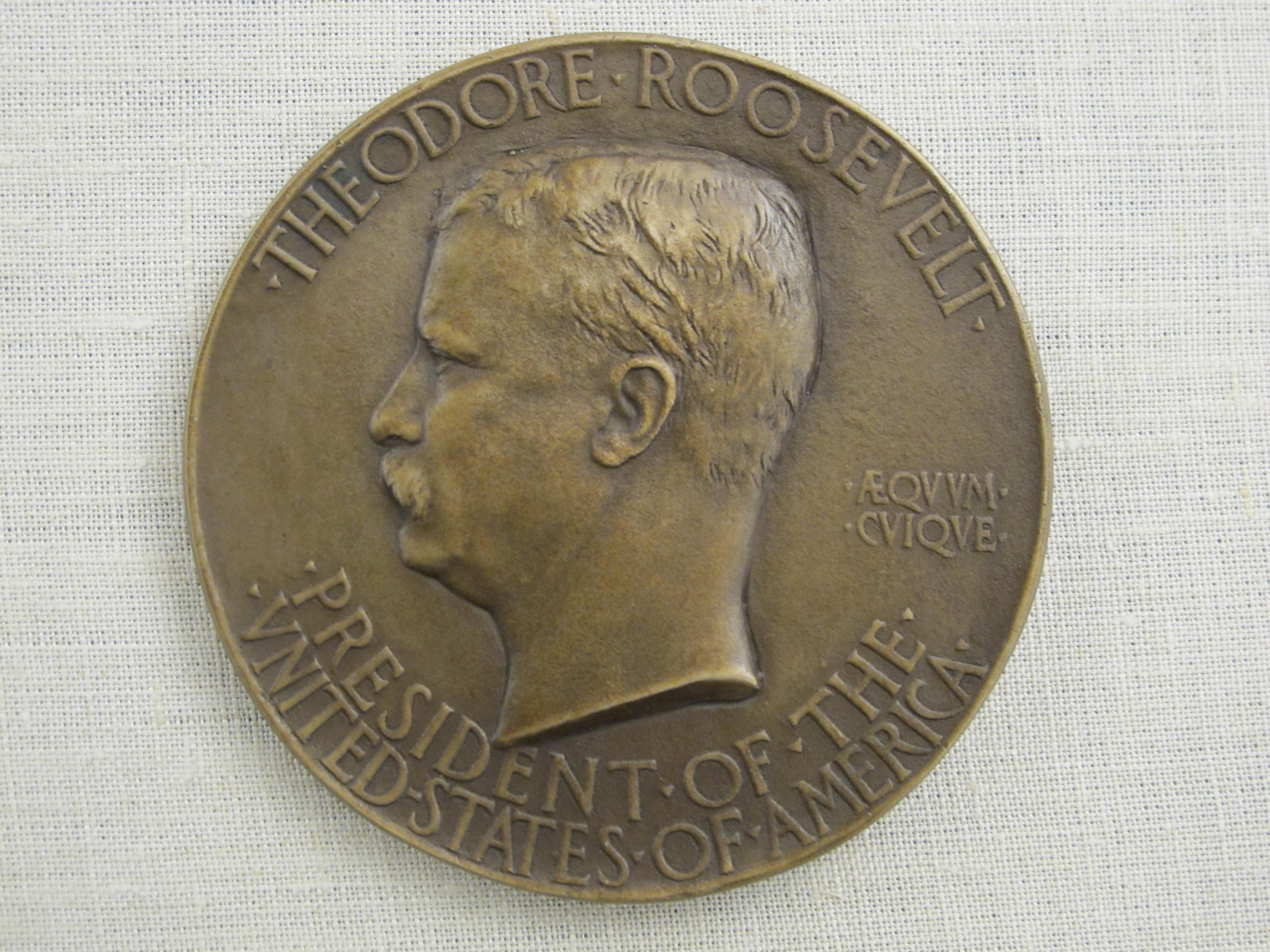
Obverse of a 1905 Roosevelt presidential inaugural medal.

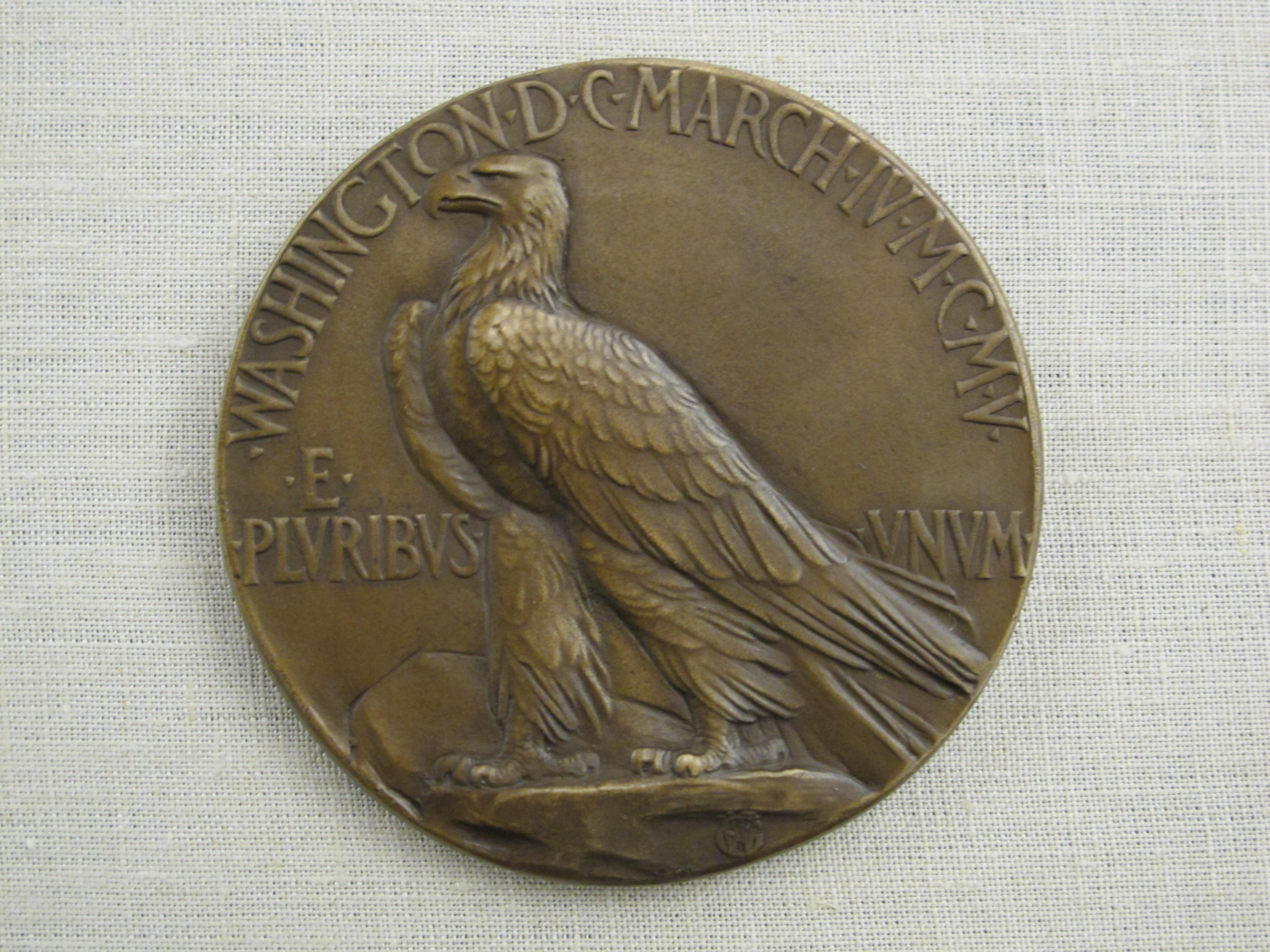
Reverse of a 1905 Roosevelt presidential inaugural medal.

During Roosevelt's second inaugural address, he spoke of past successes and asserted that any success in the future will only come with hard work. He commented on how any weak nation shall have nothing to fear from the US, but stated that America will not be the subject for insolent aggression. The president cited good relations with the world as being important, but relations among Americans as most important. He said that the Founding Fathers could not have foreseen certain problems that plagued the nation, but assures that these are problems that all great nations face. Roosevelt recognized that the industrial age made it difficult for Americans to adapt to the complexities of modern life, but assured Americans that the technological innovations brought tremendous change in everyday life. He spoke about the difficulty of self-government and warned that should America fail, it would shake all free nations to their foundations. Roosevelt called this a heavy responsibility, to Americans, to the world, and to the unborn generations. In his closing, Theodore Roosevelt clarified that the problems facing Americans differs from those of the Founding Fathers, but insisted that these problems be met with the same spirit.

== Inaugural Ceremonies ==
The parade was the largest and most elaborate in inaugural history up to that point. It included five Native American chiefs; among them was the famous Geronimo, the last significant holdout of the Indian-American wars following the Civil War.

== Media ==
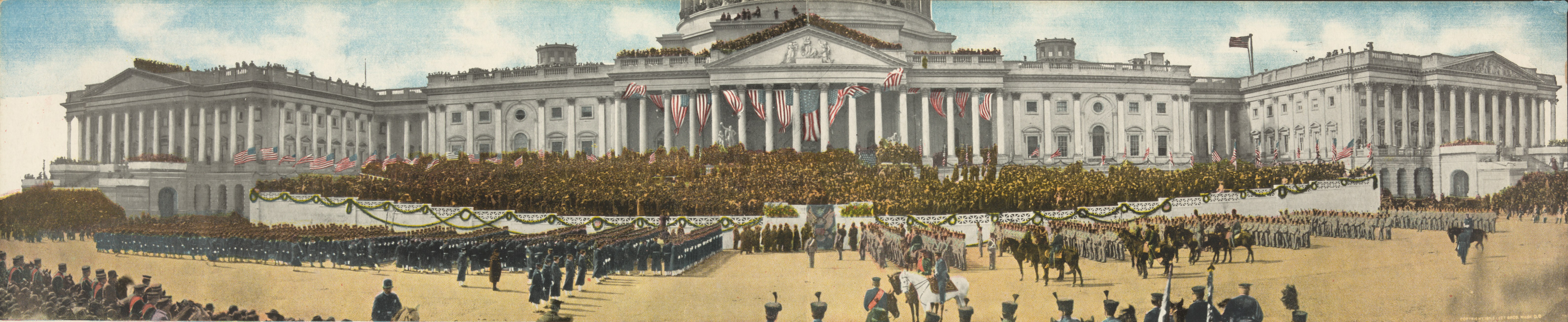
Panorama of the inauguration ceremony

== See also ==
- Presidency of Theodore Roosevelt
- First inauguration of Theodore Roosevelt
- 1904 United States presidential election
