= Catholic Church and race =

The Catholic Church and race refers to the teachings, practices and approaches of the Catholic Church in regard to race and racism. The historical views of the Catholic Church on slavery and the Catholic treatment of Indigenous peoples have been major race-related controversies within Catholicism. Although no theologically defined basis for a race-centered slavery from the Magisterium of the Catholic Church exists, the Church has operated in various societies where slavery has existed in some form as an institution, with ebbs and flows of support for emancipation of slaves as far back as the days of the Roman Empire. Typically, in regard to the early modern transatlantic slave trade, critics argue that the Church was insufficiently active in calling for the secular powers to abolish it and point to individual racial prejudice among some members of the Catholic laity. In 2023, the Roman Curia of the Vatican officially repudiated its previous support for the discovery doctrine.

Membership in the Catholic Church and reception of the Sacraments (including holy orders) is open to humans of any race or ethnicity, provided they adhere to the Catholic faith. Historical controversy and debate on the Catholic Church and race often centers on its relationship with Judaism and the Catholic Church's historical hostility to Jews and Judaism. Some Jews and supporters of interfaith dialogue believe the Church's discrimination against Jews, in cases such as the Marranos in Spain constitutes antisemitism, while supporters of the Church often categorise this as anti-Judaism (based on religious adherence rather than descent). Many of the debates surrounding this led to Nostra aetate.

== History ==
Pius XI opposed racism,[1] considering it a form of materialism and a dogmatic error.

=== Race and ethnicity ===
==== Jews and Judaism ====
The Catholic Church has had a troubled relationship with the Jewish faith for a very long time, with Christians having a negative attitude towards Jews and being extremely opposed to them, so much so that it can be noted that there was an extreme "level of hostility against Jews inculcated by the Church", dating as far back as the sixteenth century, where “blood purity laws” prevented and limited people who had converted from Judaism from public office. Further examples of systemic racist behaviour can be noted throughout history, including racist rhetoric contained in Christian literature and the behaviour of certain notable Catholic figures towards the Jewish community. There are multiple examples of these incidents, ranging from the seventeenth century, where the Vatican employed an infamous 'Jewish convert' who spoke in opposition to baptising members of the Jewish community, and in the nineteenth century the forced resignation of an archbishop due to his Jewish ancestry.

However, the Second World War and The Holocaust was a pivotal moment for the Catholic Church and its perception of Judaism, with historical readings mostly centered on the documentation of the Church's shortcomings in its attempts to denounce antisemitic behavior during this period.

Gradually, a shift in the Catholic Church's perspectives on Judaism and the Jewish community was achieved, largely during the Second Vatican Council which was called by Pope John XXIII. In its document Nostra aetate, the Council overwhelmingly ruled in favor of the rejection of rhetoric which stated that God did not kindly look upon the Jews, by stating that the Jews cannot be collectively held accountable for the Crucifixion of Jesus. The Vatican later published a document in which it reflected upon the Church's responsibility to atone for its history of discrimination against the Jews, titled, ‘We Remember: A Reflection on the Shoah”.

==== African-Americans ====
For a very long time, the African-American population has been discriminated against and overlooked by the dominant society in the United States, including Catholics. Segregated churches were a common practice during the twentieth century. Moreover, during the earlier half of the twentieth century, African-Americans were not admitted to most Catholic universities and colleges. This practice was widespread during the period of Jim Crow laws that ended in 1968. After the Catholic hierarchy's decision to adopt a more prominent oppositional stance towards combating racism, elements in the Church resisted and change has been slow in coming.

Furthermore, during the latter half of the 20th century, when racial inclusion and acceptance were at the forefront of Catholic ideology and rhetoric, it was still understood by many African-American Bishops and Church leaders, as well as by the African-American community as a whole, that its plight was largely overlooked, and as a result, very little had been done to assist this minority group. Theologian James Cone, who is often viewed as the 'pioneer of Black theology', aimed to articulate the struggle of the African-American community in achieving liberation and equality through an analysis of the Catholic faith and the gospel. He wrote: "The task of black theology ... is to analyse the nature of the gospel of Jesus Christ in light of oppressed blacks so they will see the gospel as inseparable from their humiliated condition, and as bestowing on them the necessary power to break the chains of oppression." His understanding was that Bishops and other religious leaders simply could not grasp the incredibly pervasive and ingrained nature of racism in American culture, heightened and manifested through issues of slavery and lynching, where 'white dominance' was so forcefully asserted, and that these Catholic leaders' theological reflections and discussions were inadequate rather than 'fundamentally flawed'. This idea is encompassed in statements made by many African-American professors and church leaders, including Cone who summarizes:

What is it about the Catholic definition of justice that makes many persons of that faith progressive in their attitude toward the poor in Central America but reactionary in their views toward the poor in black America? … It is the failure of the Catholic Church to deal effectively with the problem of racism that causes me to question the quality of its commitment to justice in other areas.

==== Indigenous peoples ====
The idea of the Catholic church and the repression of Indigenous cultural practices is exemplified through their agenda, which aimed to achieve “cultural hegemony”. Furthermore, in compliance with the national and state policies concerning Indigenous Australians and their rights, the Church continued to disregard these marginalised people: “As the functionaries of the Protection and Assimilation policies, the Catholic Church has directly contributed to the current disadvantage experienced by Indigenous Australians.” It should be acknowledged, however, that there was some attempt on the part of the Catholic Church to uphold and advocate for Indigenous rights during colonisation.

== Current attitudes ==
The current attitude and view which is formally held by the Catholic Church is of greater sensitivity with regard to racist thought compared to earlier periods of Catholic history and the Catholic Church has publicly committed to fighting against ethnic and racial discrimination in accordance with their interpretation of the teachings of Jesus Christ. The Church has shifted its perspective, coinciding with the world's increasing awareness of racial discrimination, adopting a more inclusive approach. This is expressed in a statement made in 1997 by Catholic bishops in Louisiana, stating,

The teaching of the Roman Catholic Church on racism is clear. Racism is morally wrong. To persist obstinately in this stance is un-Christian.

And again, by the Saint Paul and Minneapolis branch of Catholic Charities USA:

Racism is a serious offense against God precisely because it violates the innate dignity of the human person. At its core, racism is a failure to love our neighbour.

== Catholic responses ==
The Church addressed responses to resolve issues of racism through reflections on doctrine and statements made by Catholic leaders. Encyclicals and documents produced over the years discuss the opposition of the Church on issues of racial bias and discrimination. Some aim to take responsibility for the Church's involvement in dealing with racial bias, "As we confront our own complicity with the sin of racism, may we constantly refer back to that all-important teaching as a reminder of why we need to root racism out of our hearts, our culture and the institutions of society." While in earlier years a broader definition of racism as a societal issue was acknowledged, a more recent recognition of systemic and internalised racism has been incorporated into Catholic thought, allowing a deeper, more enhanced awareness of the issue, placing the Church in a more effective position to combat these ideals. This is highlighted in, “Racism is both individual and institutional. Individual racism is expressed through a person’s prejudicial actions and words."

Leaders within the Catholic church continue to reflect on providing solutions to racial bias that correlate with Catholic values and beliefs. Often, these proposed solutions focus on an understanding that racism goes beyond individual will and is an injustice rooted deep within society., Therefore, government intervention and institutional collaboration is called upon to right these wrongs and eliminate harmful societal structures. Religious figures such as Cardinal Roger Mahony have used this understanding of the pervasive nature of racism in society to defend practices that assist marginalised people, such as affirmative action.

Concerning the Indigenous Australian population, the Catholic Church has made no steps towards achieving reconciliation. A speech delivered by Reverend David Gill of the National Council of Churches in Australia, titled 'Reparations and Reconciliation – A Perspective from the Churches', exemplifies this, in which an outline of the different attempts to achieve reconciliation are outlined. These include churches acknowledging the pain that they have caused and apologising for it, as well as the actions of specific organisations designed to assist people who were affected by the Indigenous child removal policy. The Catholic Church's "A Piece of the Story" is a national collection of records of the different Catholic organisations that are focused on looking after children who were affected by the child separation policy.
