= Theodore Roosevelt Inaugural National Historic Site =

Historic house in Buffalo, New York

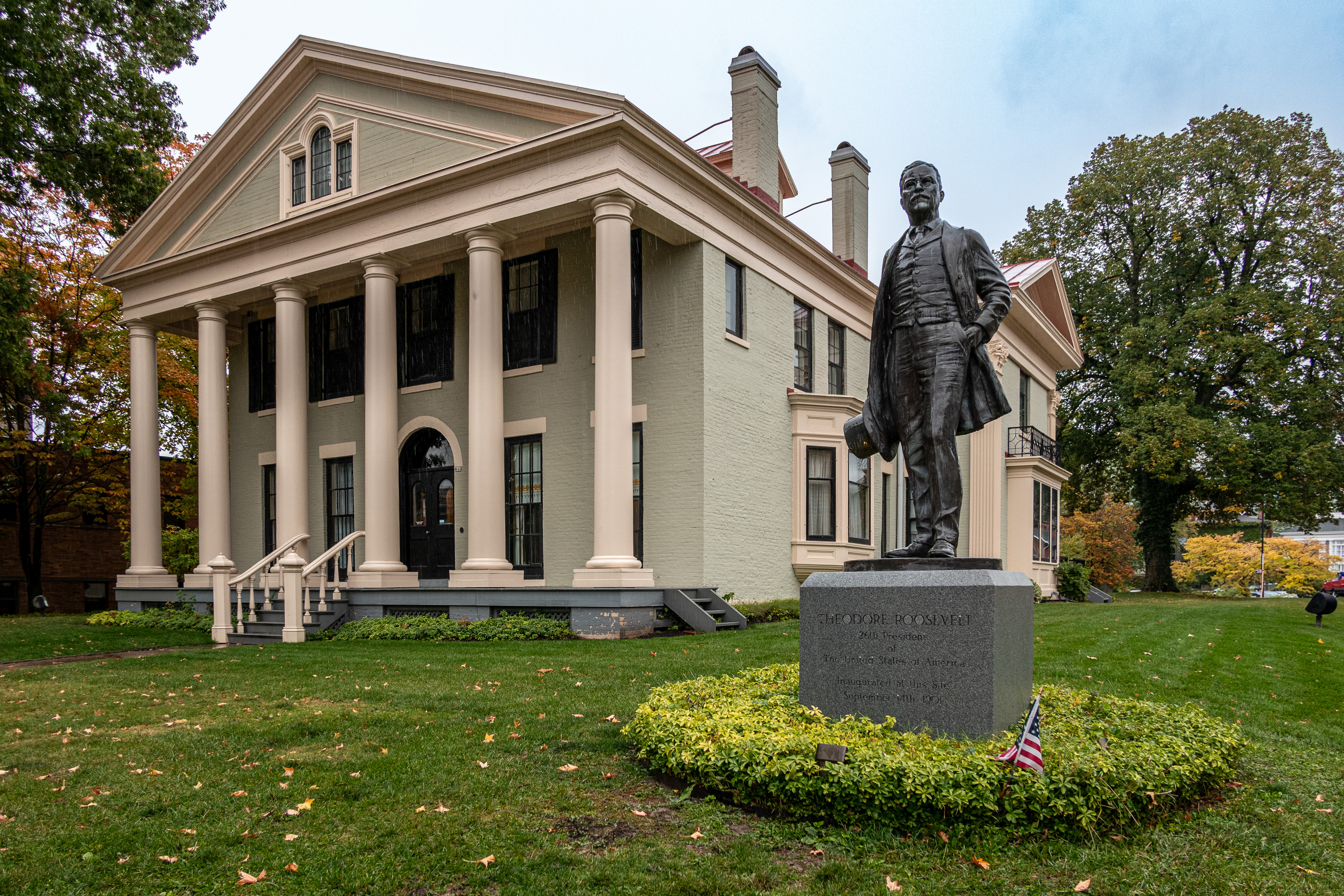
- Ansley Wilcox House and statue

- Location within New York Location within the United States
- Location: Buffalo, New York, US
- Coordinates: 42°54′5.3″N 78°52′20.7″W
- Area: 1.03 acres (0.42 ha)
- Established: November 2, 1966
- Visitors: 30,141 (in 2024)
- Governing body: National Park Service
- Website: Theodore Roosevelt Inaugural National Historic Site
- Theodore Roosevelt Inaugural National Historic Site
- U.S. National Register of Historic Places
- U.S. Historic district – Contributing property
- New York State Register of Historic Places
- Location: 641 Delaware Ave., Buffalo, New York
- Area: 1 acre (0.40 ha)
- Built: 1901
- Architects: Cary, George; U.S. Army
- Architectural style: Greek Revival
- Part of: Allentown Historic District (ID80002605)
- NRHP reference No.: 66000516
- NYSRHP No.: 02940.001050

Significant dates
- Added to NRHP: November 2, 1966
- Designated NYSRHP: June 23, 1980

Theodore Roosevelt Inaugural National Historic Site preserves the Ansley Wilcox House, at 641 Delaware Avenue in Buffalo, New York. Here, after the assassination of William McKinley, Theodore Roosevelt took the oath of office as President of the United States on September 14, 1901. A New York historical marker outside the house indicates that it was the site of Theodore Roosevelt's Inauguration.

== Property history ==
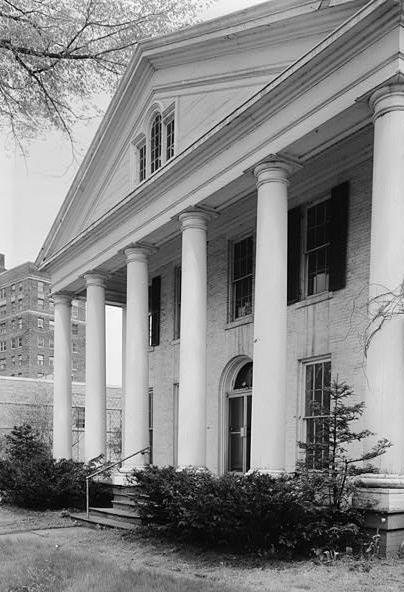
Ansley Wilcox House, 1965

The oldest part of the National Historic Site includes the lone surviving structure from the Buffalo Barracks compound. Due to tensions between the United States and the British Province of Upper Canada (subsequently the British Province of Canada), a military post was constructed to ensure border security. Built in 1839, the post encompassed all the land from Allen Street to North Street and Delaware Ave to Main Street. The structure that would later be incorporated into the Theodore Roosevelt Inaugural National Historic Site started life in 1840 as the Barracks' officers' quarters.

After the post was disbanded in 1845, the home reverted to a private residence. Subsequent owners continued to modify the structure adding and demolishing out structures and additions. In the late 19th century, Dexter Rumsey gave the property to his son-in-law Ansley Wilcox and his wife Mary Grace Rumsey. The newest inhabitants made extensive renovations to the structure. Plans of these renovations are still on file at the Historic Site.

=== Inauguration of Theodore Roosevelt ===
In 1901, while attending the Pan-American Exposition, President William McKinley was shot twice at close range by anarchist Leon Czolgosz. Vice President Theodore Roosevelt came to Buffalo and stayed at his friend Wilcox's home while visiting the President before leaving.

Although early doctor's reports on the President's condition were positive, McKinley's condition soon worsened: while Vice President Theodore Roosevelt rushed back to Buffalo, he was informed on the way that McKinley had died. Wilcox again offered Roosevelt to stay at his home.

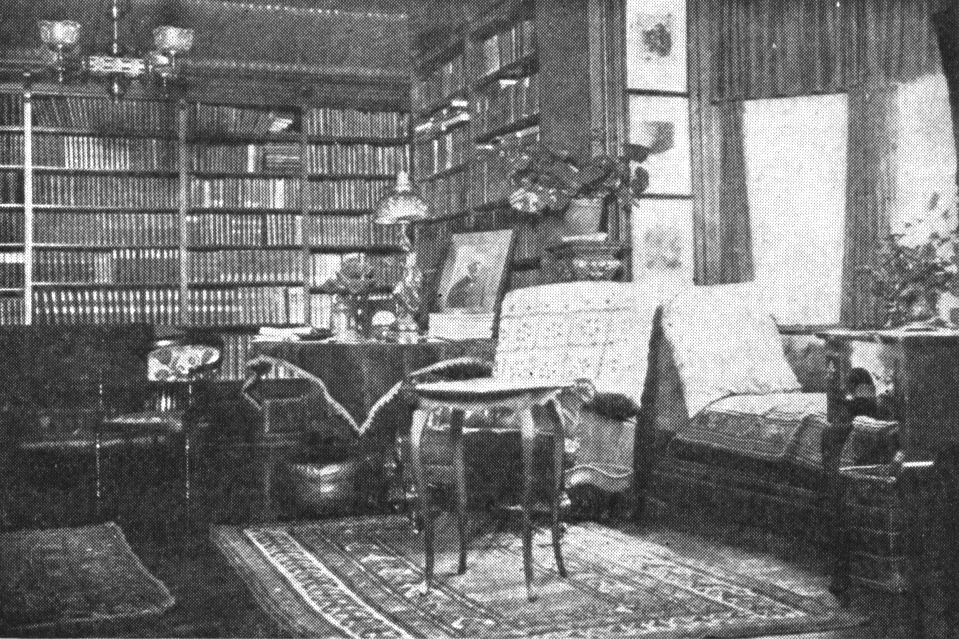
Interior of room in Wilcox House where President Theodore Roosevelt took the oath of office.

It was decided to conduct the inauguration immediately, due to the tragic and politically charged circumstances of President McKinley's death. The most appropriate site was determined to be the Wilcox home. Approximately 50 dignitaries, family members and cabinet officials gathered in the front library for the inauguration, while Federal Judge John R. Hazel administered the oath. No photographic image exists of the ceremony itself, although the room was heavily photographed after the inauguration had concluded.

=== Later history ===
The Wilcoxes continued to live in the home until their deaths in the 1930s. The home's furniture was sold at a public auction and the property became the Kathryn Lawrence Restaurant in 1938. The proprietors removed interior walls, demolished a carriage house, and painted many of the finished wood surfaces before the restaurant ceased operations in 1961.

== Museum ==
The first part of the house is a museum displaying many items from the 1901 Pan-American Exposition, including wine glasses, plates, playing cards, and the key to the Temple of Music. The last room is a recreation of the office Roosevelt used during his presidency, and includes an interactive desk which visitors can use to send e-mails to themselves.

== Administrative history ==
The National Historic Site was authorized on November 2, 1966, to protect the building. As a historic area administered by the National Park Service, it was automatically listed on the National Register of Historic Places the same day.

== See also ==
- Presidential memorials in the United States
- Roosevelt–Marcy Trail
