= Miguel Méndez =

American writer and educator (1930–2013)

- Born: Miguel Méndez Morales; June 15, 1930; Bisbee, Arizona
- Died: May 31, 2013 (aged 82); Tucson, Arizona
- Occupations: Novelist, professor (retired)
- Writing career
- Pen name: Miguel Méndez
- Period: 1969–2013
- Genres: short story, novel, poetry, autobiography
- Notable work: Peregrinos de Aztlán (Pilgrims in Aztlán)
- Notable awards: Premio Nacional de Literatura Mexicana Jose Fuentes Mares
- Movements: Aztlán, Chicano

Miguel Méndez (June 15, 1930 – May 31, 2013) was the pen name for Miguel Méndez Morales, a Mexican American author best known for his novel Peregrinos de Aztlán (Pilgrims in Aztlán). He was a leading figure in the field of Chicano literature.

== Biography ==
=== Early life ===
Méndez was born in the border town of Bisbee, Arizona, on 15 June 1930. His father, Francisco Méndez Cárdenas, was from a town called Bacoachi, in the state of Sonora, Mexico; his mother, María Morales Siqueiros, was from Arizpe, Sonora. During the nineteen thirties, the United States government urged Mexicans and Mexican-Americans to leave the United States and go to Mexico, even if they were American citizens, largely due to the Great Depression. As a result of this policy, Méndez' parents moved to El Claro, Sonora, where he grew up. Méndez attended elementary school in el Claro and Arizpe, but left school after the fifth grade in order to work in his father's small corn and cotton plot. Even though El Claro was a small, isolated town, his parents had boxes full of books and newspapers, and it was during those early years that he developed his love of literature.

=== Return to the U.S. ===
In 1944, Méndez moved to Tucson, Arizona. He has asserted that one of the reasons that pushed him to move to the U.S. was the desperation he felt when, in 1939, two of his younger sisters died of pneumonia. This was due in part to the isolation of El Claro, which had no hospital or clinic. Once in Tucson, despite his young age, Méndez found a job in construction. During those years, he continued to read, mostly at night. He used to buy books in a bookstore called "Librería Hermanos Pulido" that carried books and magazines in Spanish.

=== Life as a writer and professor ===
In the 1960s, Méndez was still working in construction, but had not stopped reading. By this time he had started to write more seriously. "Tata Casehua", his first short story, appeared in 1968. Throughout the years, Méndez had developed a relationship with teachers and professors at the University of Arizona and Pima Community College. In 1970, he was subjected to an examination by a group of university professors, and was awarded a teaching position in Pima Community College. In 1974, he started teaching at the University of Arizona, and was awarded a Doctor of Humane Letters degree in 1984. His most famous novel, Peregrinos de Azltán, was published in 1974. In 2000 he retired as a Full Professor. He was an emeritus Professor at the University of Arizona until his death in 2013. A Festschrift in his honor was published in 1995, Miguel Mendez in Aztlan: Two Decades of Literary Production.

Méndez has been described as “one of the principal voices of socially committed Chicano fiction” by the editors of Chicano Literature: A Reference Guide and as "one of [Chicano literature's] finest and most sensitive writers" in The Dictionary of Literary Biography’s Chicano Writers First Series. His papers are now archived at the California Ethnic and Multicultural Archives at UC Santa Barbara.

Mendez died on May 31, 2013, at his Tucson home.

== Pilgrims in Aztlán ==
This novel is set in 1960s-era Tijuana and reflects both the time of the Vietnam War and the space of the Mexico–United States border. The central character of Loreto Maldonado, an old man reduced to washing cars in his final days, also allows Méndez to flashback to the Mexican Revolution. Méndez introduces characters from a variety of backgrounds in order to illustrate the multiple cultures that exist on the border—not just Chicano, but Mexican, Yaqui and US as well. Méndez does not provide a straightforward plot for the novel, but uses the encounters between characters to reveal their histories and thus to trace out the history and culture of the border region.

== Published works ==
- "Tata Casehua" and "Taller de Imagenes" (short stories), published in El Espejo/The Mirror (1969)
- Los criaderos humanos: épica de los desamparados y Sahuaros (poems; 1975)
- Cuento para niños precoces (1980)
- The Dream of Santa Maria de las Piedras (1989)
- Pilgrims in Aztlán (1992)
- Entre Letras y Ladrillos (1996), trans. as From Labor to Letters : A Novel Autobiography (1997)

== Awards ==
- José Fuentes Mares National Prize for Literature (1991)

== See also ==
- List of Mexican American writers
