= Stanley Keleman =

- Born: November 1931; Brooklyn, New York, U.S.
- Died: August 11, 2018 (aged 86); Berkeley, California, U.S.
- Education: Chiropractic Institute of New York; Alfred Adler Institute
- Known for: Formative Psychology body psychotherapy
- Website: http://centerpress.com/

Stanley Keleman (November 1931 – August 11, 2018) was an American writer and chiropractic, who claimed to have invented the school of "formative psychology".

Keleman started developing and articulating his concepts in 1957. In 1971, he published the first of 10 books.

== Early life ==
Keleman was born in Brooklyn in 1931, the son of Jewish immigrants from Hungary and Romania. He graduated from the Chiropractic Institute of New York in 1954.

== Career ==
=== Early career ===
He became a chiropractic in 1955, eventually specialising in stress reduction. During his early years of practice, Keleman claimed to have observed a relationship between emotional conflict, physical movement and distortions of body posture.

In his writings, he claims that his theory of stress reduction draws upon the characterological approaches of Lowen, Freud, and Reich. Following his discovery, he began conducting emotional expression classes, which he believed would explore the relationship between movement patterns and psychological expression.

At this same time, he began a personal mentorship with Nina Bull, formerly a research associate at Columbia University, and author of The Attitude Theory of Emotion. He collaborated with her on a research project which resulted in her book, The Body and Its Mind. This work was highly influential in Keleman's later chiropractic thinking and practice, as it led Keleman to believe that physical actions created emotions and not the other way round. Following this realisation, Keleman emphasised postural reorganization in chiropractic as a means of reshaping human emotion. Keleman claims that through breathing modification and muscle manipulation, mood and executive function can be improved.

In the early 1960s, he studied Dasein Analysis in Zurich with Dori Gutscher, in the school of Medard Boss, and in Germany with Professor Karlfried Graf Durckheim, at the Center for Initiation Studies. From these experiences, Keleman added a philosophical orientation to his theory, which formerly had an instinctual and social emphasis. These workshops evolved into the annual programs taught by Keleman in Berkeley and Solingen, Germany, that connect dreams, body and the formative process.

=== Awards and honors ===
He was the recipient of Lifetime Achievement Awards from the USA Association of Body Psychotherapy June 2005 and the European Association for Body Psychotherapy in Berlin in September 2007. He received an Honorary Ph.D. from Saybrook University in San Francisco in June 2007 for his contributions to the field of Body Psychotherapy and Humanistic Psychology.

Keleman was the Honorary President and Director of Research at the Zurich School for Form and Movement in Zurich, Switzerland, the Brazilian Center of Formative Psychology in Rio de Janeiro, Brazil, and at the Institute for Formative Psychology in Solingen, Germany where he also taught.

== Bibliography ==
- Keleman, Stanley (1999). Myth & The Body: A Colloquy with Joseph Campbell]. Berkeley, CA: Center Press. ISBN 0-934320-17-9.
- Keleman, Stanley (1994). Love: A Somatic View Berkeley, CA: Center Press. ISBN 0-934320-15-2.
- Keleman, Stanley (1989).Patterns of Distress: Emotional Insults and Human Form. Berkeley, CA: Center Press. ISBN 0-934320-13-6.
- Keleman, Stanley (1996). Bonding: A Somatic Emotional Approach to Transference Berkeley, CA: Center Press. ISBN 0-934320-11-X.
- Keleman, Stanley (1987). Embodying Experience: Forming a Personal Life Berkeley, CA: Center Press. ISBN 0-934320-12-8.
- Keleman, Stanley (1985). Emotional Anatomy Berkeley, CA: Center Press. ISBN 0-934320-10-1.
- Keleman, Stanley (1983) 'In Defense of Heterosexuality Berkeley, CA: Center Press. ISBN 0-934320-06-3
- Keleman, Stanley (1979). Somatic Reality. Berkeley, CA: Center Press. ISBN 0-934320-05-5.
- Keleman, Stanley (1981). Your Body Speaks Its Mind Berkeley, CA: Center Press. ISBN 0-934320-01-2. Originally published by Simon and Schuster in 1975.
- Keleman, Stanley (1974) Living Your Dying Berkeley, CA: Center Press. ISBN 0-934320-09-8.
- Keleman, Stanley (1971). Human Ground: Sexuality, Self and Survival . Berkeley, CA: Center Press. p. 195. ISBN 0-934320-02-0.
