= Ricardo Cruz (lawyer) =

American lawyer

Ricardo Cruz (July 1, 1943 – July 21, 1993), aka Richard V. (Vincent) Cruz, was a Los Angeles, California attorney who fought for many Chicano Movement causes. He was an early organizer of La Raza Law Students and the short-lived but highly effective Catolicos Por La Raza in the 1960s and 1970s.

== Childhood and education ==
Cruz grew up in the Highland Park neighborhood of Los Angeles. His father was a musician who played in commercially-unsuccessful big bands before dealing in real estate, and his mother was a legal secretary. Cruz received a Catholic education, attending Divine Saviour Catholic Elementary School and Cathedral High School. In high school, he was a class officer and enjoyed speech and debate, winning some speech awards. He developed a deep faith early on, and retained an admiration for the morals taught at Catholic schools and the Catholic philosophical tradition, especially that of the Jesuits, even after he stopped identifying as a Catholic. He attended the Oakland campus of Saint Mary's College of California from 1961—1962, where he was one of only two Mexican-American students, and one of the few from a lower-class family. He attended Los Angeles City College from 1962—1965, during which time he worked full-time as a transcriber/typist for the Los Angeles County Probation Department. He earned a B.A. in Philosophy from California State University, Los Angeles in 1966. After graduation, he continued to work for the Probation Department, undergoing an on-the-job training program. He dropped out after three months, and began driving a taxi. He then drove to New York and stayed with two cousins in Brooklyn, where he "bummed around" until his money ran low, at which point he got a job as an investigating probation officer with the New York State Supreme Court Probation Department. He was promoted to supervising officer and was assigned the narcotics caseload. In August 1967, he returned to Los Angeles to attend Loyola Law School. During his first year, he worked with Pat Nave to organize Law Students Community Service Association (LSCSA) "to recruit and finance the legal education of minorities", but soon realized that he and his colleagues were being used by the administration: "We do the work, etc. They weren't sincere." As a result he helped to create La Raza Law Students, an organization dedicated to increasing Chicano enrollment in schools of law. Loyola law students joined with students from USC and UCLA in demanding financial assistance and realistic admissions criteria. He was elected chapter chairman, and LRLS soon had branches throughout the state. This was the time of the East Los Angeles Blowouts, and Cruz became interested in the Chicano Movement, but decided could do more for the cause if he remained in law school. He earned his J.D. in 1971. In 1968, Cruz was fulfilling a legal internship with California Rural Legal Assistance in Salinas when he was invited to a "secret meeting" in Santa Barbara between César Chávez and his lawyers to discuss the lack of Church support for the UFW-backed grape boycott. At that meeting, Cruz promised Chávez that he would do whatever he could to bring about Church support.

== Católicos por la Raza ==
When he returned to Los Angeles, he teamed up with Los Angeles City College's MEChA, who had independently begun work on Roman Catholic Church issues. A coalition of students, welfare mothers, Brown Berets, and Immaculate Heart nuns joined to become Católicos por la Raza. On October 11, 1969, a group of Chicano students tried to see Cardinal James Francis McIntyre, but only Cruz and Joe Aragon were admitted. Despite their showing the utmost deference, the Cardinal treated them, they said, "like trash". After their dismissal, 15 to 20 CPLR members pushed their way into the chancery (Church headquarters and the Cardinal's residence) and the Cardinal threatened to have them arrested. On October 18, 1969, the CPLR passed a resolution to pressure the church. On December 4, 1969, they held a press conference to make demands of the Church and to announce the first public demonstration to be held at St. Basil's. It was attended by only one reporter—the Los Angeles Times's Rubén Salazar. On December 7, 1969, about 500 people picketed St. Basil's without incident. They began planning for a demonstration to be held on Christmas Eve. They returned to St. Basil's on Christmas Day to continue the protest. On December 29, sympathizer Bishop Parilla from Puerto Rico celebrated mass in a dirt lot across the street from the church. From January 1–4, the Católicos engaged in a hunger strike on the lawn of St. Basil's. On January 22, 1970, Cardinal McIntyre resigned and the Católicos met with the new archbishop Manning to discuss their demands. Exactly one month after the Christmas Eve protest, 3,000 people, many of them high school students, conducted a midnight march from the downtown chancery to St. Basil's, where they celebrated the 7:00 am mass. On September 13, 1970, the Católicos conducted their final action: a "Baptism by Fire", during which Cruz, his brother, and some 20 others burned their baptism certificates.

== Criticisms of the Church ==
The Catholic Church's refusal to support the UFW grape boycott was all the more blatant when the Episcopalians and several Jewish organizations joined it. Cruz saw hypocrisy in the Church's silence and inaction, as it used few of its vast resources to better the worldly condition of its members. This condition was exacerbated in Los Angeles, whose Archdiocese was one of the wealthiest in the nation and served some of its poorest members, and where white domination of the Church's interior structures places Latinos at a disadvantage. This realization led him to further criticisms. The Second Vatican Council, though reform-minded, was reluctant to embrace Liberation theology, and as a result did not embrace social and economic struggles. The Católicos pressured the Church to pay heed to its members' material needs, as well as their spiritual needs. They also fought Anglo-American domination of the diocese, and pressured the Church to provide more scholarships. Because of their criticisms of the Church, they were regarded as a radical organization.

== Conflict at St. Basil's ==
Having failed to obtain reform within the archdiocese through peaceful means, the Católicos targeted the recently constructed (to the tune of $4 million) St. Basil Catholic Church on Wilshire Boulevard. On Christmas Eve, 1969, Cruz led a march of several hundred demonstrators to protest before the church's first Christmas Eve mass. When they attempted to enter the church for mass, Los Angeles County Sheriff's Department's deputies, disguised as ushers, brutalized them. The LAPD arrived "for mopping-up operations" and beat and maced fifteen and arrested seven. Meanwhile, the parishioners inside continued singing and listening to Cardinal McIntyre decry the demonstrators as "rabble". At 5:00 am on January 20, 1970, LAPD officers arrested Cruz and twenty others, including Alicia Escalante, chair of the East Los Angeles Welfare Rights Organization, in connection with the Christmas Eve demonstration.

== Aftermath ==
Shortly after the incident, the Catholic Church announced its support for the boycott. Los Angeles Archbishop McIntyre, accused by the Católicos of paternalistic attitudes towards Mexicans and Chicanos in the administration of the bishopric, stepped down in 1970. The Church began funding the Campaign for Human Development, which provided social services for the poor. Pressure from the Católicos also brought about the appointment of two Latinos within the church hierarchy, Bishop Juan Arzube, a South American, and Bishop Flores. And, following the events, the leaders of the archdiocese were less hostile to the incorporation of Mexican cultural elements into worship. Despite the success of the Católicos, Cruz faced trouble as a result of his involvement in the protest. In 1972, he served three months in jail as a result of the St. Basil's incident. In 1971, despite passing his exam, the State Bar of California denied him certification due to his "moral turpitude for disrupting a religious service". He was subjected to 23 hearings, during which the American Civil Liberties Union and new Los Angeles Archbishop Timothy Manning lobbied on his behalf, before finally being admitted to the bar in 1973.

== Legal career ==
As an attorney, Cruz helped organize "Abogados de Aztlan", ("Attorneys of Aztlan") a consortium of Chicano attorneys based in the Los Angeles metropolitan area dedicated to addressing the issues of socio economic discrimination against Mexican-Americans. The Abogados, along with La Raza Law Students, published Justicia O., a bilingual paper dealing with legal and criminal justice issues. He was active with Mexican American Legal Defense and Education Fund (MALDEF), and opened his own law practice in East Los Angeles in 1974. Cruz helped form a Southern California branch of the Raza Unida Party, most notably organizing a voter registration drive in the city of Hawaiian Gardens that sought the election of Chicano City council members. He was an organizer of the East Los Angeles Chicano Moratorium against the Vietnam War and racist police brutality.

During the 1970s, Cruz fought against the Los Angeles County policy of forcibly sterilizing indigent and undocumented patients at Los Angeles County-USC Medical Center, many of whom were sterilized without sufficient awareness that they had consented to being the procedure. Although he was not a litigant in the case, (Madrigal v. Quilligan), he was an early organizer of advocates for the women who felt they had been coerced. The case was dismissed, but the media attention he and other activists brought to the plight of the victims brought about a change in the policy.

In 1982, Cruz fought for and won the dismissal of a murder charges against a young Chicano prisoner, Gordon Castillo Hall. Hall had been convicted of murdering a Duarte postal worker, but received inadequate representation. There is also evidence to suggest that the actual murderer had been identified but never prosecuted by the District Attorney. Cruz cited these two miscarriages of justice, as well as the court's non-admission of exculpatory evidence, in his argument for dismissal of the sentence. Hall was released after serving three years in prison.

== Honors ==
For his work on behalf of the Chicano community, Cruz earned the following recognition:

- Outstanding Service In The Field Of Law, Association of Mexican American Educators, State of California, November 14, 1981
- Skip Glenn Award, California Attorneys for Criminal Justice, November 21, 1981
- Benito Juárez Legal Award, Mexican American Bar Association, 1982

== Religious views ==
In response to a 1973 survey, Cruz wrote:

Well, once I got rid of religion, then my spiritual self, my identity, my fears, my strengths, my confidence, everything, everything, became much more realistic. No longer was I relating to heavens and hells, goods and evils and spooky stories and mortal and venial [sic] sins. I became what I am - an animal, a human animal. My choices became my own two feet in other words. I had to stand up like a man instead of like I did for many years - praying for somebody to do this or that, usually with respect to me. Now I make them do it or not, if it's good. It's been a great benefit for me to get rid of religion.

== Illness and death ==
Cruz, a 33-year smoker, was diagnosed with lung cancer. Always a healthy man, he had neglected to obtain medical insurance. In addition, both the sterilization case and the Hall case were long, drawn-out affairs with little compensation. In order to help defray the cost of his treatment, he decided to take advantage of his reputation for throwing some of the best parties of the Chicano Movement to turn his 50th birthday celebration into a fundraiser. In a letter expressing regret that she could not attend, Los Angeles County Supervisor Gloria Molina commended Cruz as "a legal advocate who, instead of racking in the bucks, racked up a stellar reputation for his compassion, justness and commitment to those in need." The treatment was unsuccessful and Cruz died on July 21, 1993.

== Literature ==
The events at St. Basil's were memorialized in Oscar Zeta Acosta's Revolt of the Cockroach People and recorded as a major event of the Chicano Movement in Rodolfo Acuña's Occupied America.
