= Kevin Pope (cartoonist) =

American cartoonist

Kevin Pope, born in 1958 in Carmel, Indiana, is a cartoonist whose work has appeared in the pages of MAD Magazine since 1997. He is best known to Mad readers as the artist for the "Melvin and Jenkins" series of behavioral guides. Pope has also illustrated greeting cards, advertisements, and animation design; he worked on a Pepsi-Cola commercial that aired during the Super Bowl. He has also created a series of humorous business gag panels titled "Fishstiks".
