= Kevin O. Pope =

Kevin O. Pope is the former NASA archaeologist and founder of Geo Eco Arch Research who helped connect the Chicxulub Crater to the Cretaceous–Paleogene extinction event. In 2002, Pope, along with the Geological Society of America, released a press release saying that the original Cretaceous–Paleogene impact event by a 10 km diameter asteroid was not large enough to trigger a dust-connected 'cosmic winter'. It would require significantly more fine dust to be generated in order to create this effect than has been detected. Instead he proposes that sulfate aerosols and ash from global fires was enough to create the effect of global cooling by interfering with photosynthesis.

He has also questioned whether the current size of an asteroid thought to be large enough to create a global impact is in fact too small. The current size suggestion is between 1.5–2 km which Pope argues would only create regional devastation.

He has also worked on investigating quartz found in Australia that has been "shocked" to such the extent that it has become deformed. He believes that these may have formed due to the Bedout impact as it would require enormous forces to deform the quartz. The Bedout impact coincides with the Permian–Triassic extinction event, the period known at the end-Permian where 90% of Marine and 80% of land life disappeared.
